= List of Philippine typhoons =

The Philippine Area of Responsibility (red), Tropical Cyclone Advisory Domain (orange), and Tropical Cyclone Information Domain (purple)

PAGASA's Tropical Cyclone Intensity Scale
Category	Sustained winds
Super typhoon (STY)	≥185 km/h ≥100 knots
Typhoon (TY)	118–184 km/h 64–99 knots
Severe tropical storm (STS)	89–117 km/h 48–63 knots
Tropical storm (TS)	62–88 km/h 34–47 knots
Tropical depression (TD)	≤61 km/h ≤33 knots

The Philippines is a typhoon-prone country, with approximately twenty tropical cyclones entering its area of responsibility per year. Locally known generally as bagyo ([bɐgˈjo]), typhoons regularly form in the Philippine Sea and less often, in the South China Sea, with the months of June to September being the most active, August being the month with the most activity. Each year, at least ten typhoons are expected to hit the island nation, with five expected to be destructive and powerful. In 2013, Time declared the country as the "most exposed country in the world to tropical storms".

Typhoons typically make an east-to-west route in the country, heading north or west due to the Coriolis effect. As a result, landfalls occur in the regions of the country that face the Pacific Ocean, especially Eastern Visayas, Bicol Region, and northern Luzon, whereas Mindanao is largely free of typhoons. Climate change is likely to worsen the situation, with extreme weather events including typhoons posing various risks and threats to the Philippines.

Super Typhoon Yolanda, internationally known as Typhoon Haiyan, is the deadliest typhoon to have affected the country in recorded history, killing more than 6,300 people as it crossed the Visayas region in November 2013. The strongest typhoon to make landfall in the country, as well as the strongest tropical cyclone landfall worldwide was Super Typhoon Rolly, internationally known as Typhoon Goni, which struck Catanduanes in November 2020 with 1-minute sustained winds of 315 km/h (195 mph). The wettest known tropical cyclone to impact the archipelago was the July 14–18, 1911 cyclone which dropped over 2,210 millimetres (87 in) of rainfall within a 3-day, 15-hour period in the northern city of Baguio. Tropical cyclones usually account for at least 30 percent of the annual rainfall in the northern Philippines while being responsible for less than 10 percent of the annual rainfall in the southern islands. According to the Philippine Atmospheric, Geophysical, and Astronomical Services Administration (PAGASA) in 2016, the number of destructive typhoons the country experienced annually have increased, but notes that it is too early to call it a trend.

PAGASA is the state weather agency of the Philippines. Yearly, the agency gives a local name to the typhoons that enter its area of responsibility in addition to the international name given by the Japan Meteorological Agency (JMA), the designated Regional Specialized Meteorological Center (RSMC) by the World Meteorological Organization (WMO). The state agency also regularly issues weather bulletins and advisories to the public especially during typhoons. It uses a five-point warning scale that are issued to the entirety or parts of the provinces and localities affected by a typhoon.

The National Disaster Risk Reduction and Management Council (NDRRMC) is the country's top agency for preparation and response to calamities and natural disasters, including typhoons. Additionally, each province and local government units has their own Disaster Risk Reduction and Management Office (DRRMO). Each provincial and local government is required to set aside 5% of its annual budget for disaster risk reduction, preparations, and response.

The frequency of typhoons in the Philippines have made typhoons a significant part of everyday ancient and modern Filipino culture.

== Etymology ==
Bagyo (sometimes spelled bagyu or bagyio) is the word for 'typhoon' or 'storm' in most Philippine languages, including Tagalog, Visayan, Ilocano, Bicolano, Hanunó'o, Aklanon, Pangasinan and Kapampangan. It is derived from Proto-Austronesian *baRiuS, meaning 'typhoon'. Cognates in other Austronesian languages include Sama baliw ('wind'), Amis faliyos or farios ('typhoon'); Saisiyat balosh ('typhoon'), Babuza bayus ('storm'), Puyuma variw, Bintulu bauy ('wind'), Kelabit bariw ('storm wind'), and Chamorro pakyo ('typhoon').

== Storm naming conventions ==
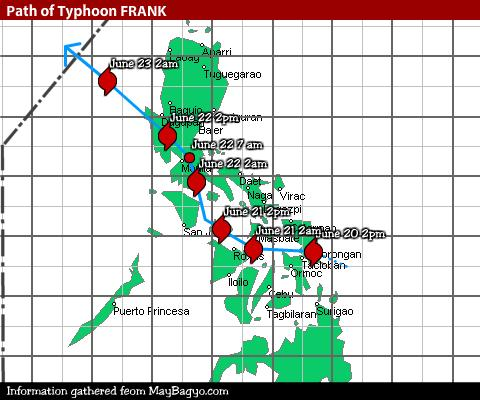
Map of the path of Typhoon Fengshen (Frank), showing it making landfall in the Eastern Visayas before taking a northwesterly path

The Joint Typhoon Warning Center in Honolulu started monitoring and naming storms in the Western Pacific region in 1945, originally using female names in English alphabetical order. That list was revised in 1979 by introducing male names to be used in alternation with the female names. The Philippine Weather Bureau started naming storms within their area of responsibility in 1963, using female Filipino names in the former native alphabetical order. The Bureau continued to monitor typhoons until the agency's abolition in 1972, after which its duties were transferred to the newly established PAGASA. This often resulted in a Western Pacific cyclone carrying two names: an international name and a local name used within the Philippines. This two-name scheme is still followed to this day.

In 2000, cyclone monitoring duties in the Western Pacific were transferred from the JTWC to the Japan Meteorological Agency, the RSMC of the World Meteorological Organization. The international naming scheme of the typhoons was replaced with a sequential list of names contributed by 14 nations in the region, including the Philippines. The new scheme largely uses terms for local features of the contributing nation, such as animals, plants, foods and adjectives in the native language. The rotation of names is based on the alphabetical order of the contributing nations. The Philippines, however, would maintain its own naming scheme for its local forecasts. In 2001, PAGASA revised its naming scheme to contain longer annual lists with a more mixed set of names.

Currently, the JMA and PAGASA each assign names to typhoons that form within or enter the Philippine Area of Responsibility. The JMA naming scheme for international use contains 140 names described above. The list is not restricted by year; the first name to be used in a typhoon season is the name after the last-named cyclone of the preceding season. The PAGASA naming scheme for Philippine use contains four lists, each containing twenty-five names arranged in alphabetical order. Every typhoon season begins with the first name in the assigned list, and the rolls of names are each reused every four years. An auxiliary list of ten names is used when the main list in a year had been exhausted. Not all Western Pacific cyclones are given names by both weather agencies, as JMA does not name tropical depressions, and PAGASA does not name cyclones outside the Philippine Area of Responsibility.

In the case of both weather agencies, names are retired after a typhoon that carried it caused severe or costly damage and loss of life. Retirement is decided by the agencies' committees, although in PAGASA's case, names are routinely retired when the cyclone caused at least 300 deaths or ₱1 billion in damage in the Philippines. Retired names are replaced with another name for the next rotation, for JMA by the nation that submitted the retired name, and for PAGASA with a name sharing the same first letter as the retired name.

== Variability in activity ==
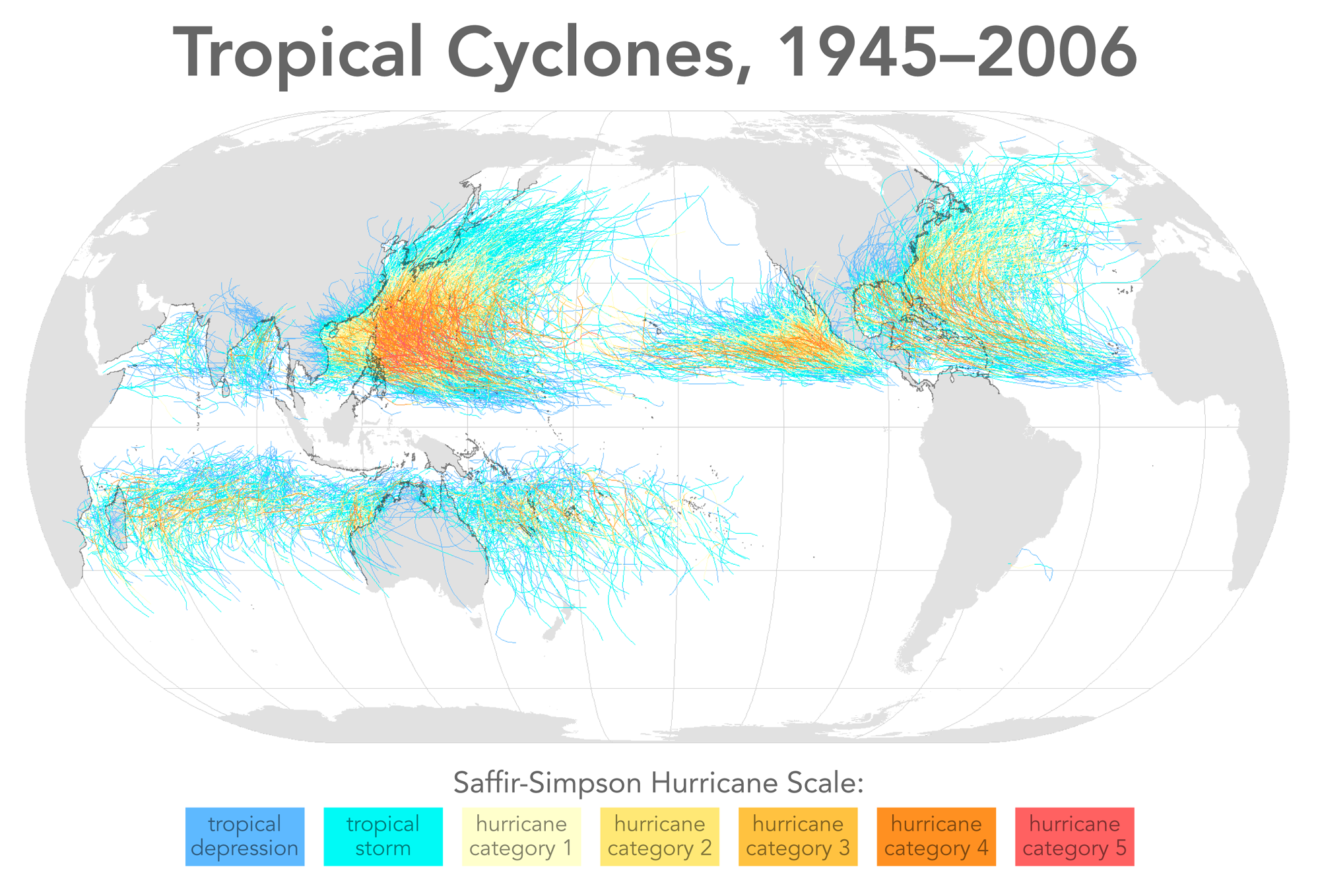
Tracks of tropical cyclones worldwide, 1945–2006. The Philippines is under the red and yellow tracks northeast of Borneo.

On an annual time scale, activity reaches a minimum in May, before increasing steadily to June, and spiking from July to September, with August being the most active month for tropical cyclones in the Philippines. Activity reduces significantly in October. The most active season, since 1945, for tropical cyclone strikes on the island archipelago was 1993 when nineteen tropical cyclones moved through the country (though there were 36 storms that were named by PAGASA). There was only one tropical cyclone which moved through the Philippines in 1958. The most frequently impacted areas of the Philippines by tropical cyclones are northern Luzon and eastern Visayas. A ten-year average of satellite determined precipitation showed that at least 30 percent of the annual rainfall in the northern Philippines could be traced to tropical cyclones, while the southern islands receive less than 10 percent of their annual rainfall from tropical cyclones.

== Warnings ==
PAGASA's Tropical Cyclone Wind Signals (TCWS)
Warning Signal	Meaning
TCWS #1	winds of 39–61 km/h (21–33 kn; 24–38 mph) are prevailing or expected to occur within 36 hours
TCWS #2	winds of 62–88 km/h (33–48 kn; 39–55 mph) are prevailing or expected to occur within 24 hours
TCWS #3	winds of 89–117 km/h (48–63 kn; 55–73 mph) are prevailing or expected to occur within 18 hours
TCWS #4	winds of 118–184 km/h (64–99 kn; 73–114 mph) are prevailing or expected to occur within 12 hours
TCWS #5	winds of 185 km/h (100 kn; 115 mph) or greater are prevailing or expected to occur within 12 hours

PAGASA releases typhoon warnings to the public. Until recently, the warning scale it used was a four-point scale, with Signal #4 being the highest possible warning issued to a locality. However, a fifth warning signal was introduced in the 2010s for powerful typhoons since Typhoon Haiyan (Yolanda) in 2013. In 2022, PAGASA revised its own definition for a "super typhoon" and its warning signals. An area having a storm signal may be under:

- Signal #1 – Tropical cyclone winds of 39 km/h (24 mph) to 61 km/h (38 mph) are expected within the next 36 hours. If a tropical cyclone forms very close to the area, then a shorter lead time is seen on the warning bulletin.
- Signal #2 – Tropical cyclone winds of 62 km/h (39 mph) to 88 km/h (55 mph) are expected within the next 24 hours.
- Signal #3 – Tropical cyclone winds of 89 km/h (55 mph) to 117 km/h (73 mph) are expected within the next 18 hours.
- Signal #4 – Tropical cyclone winds of 118 km/h (73 mph) to 184 km/h (114 mph) are expected within 12 hours.
- Signal #5 – Tropical cyclone winds of 185 km/h (115 mph) or greater are expected within 12 hours.

These warning signals are usually raised when a locality is about to be hit by a typhoon. As it gains strength and/or gets nearer to an area having a storm signal, the warning may be upgraded to a higher one for that particular area. Conversely, as a tropical cyclone weakens and/or gets farther to an area, it may be downgraded to a lower signal or may be lifted altogether.

Classes in the localities that are under a warning signal are cancelled or suspended depending on how high the signal is: preschool for Signal #1, elementary and below for Signal #2, high school (including senior high school) and below for Signal #3, and all educational levels (including colleges and universities) for Signal #4 and above. These restrictions apply for both public and private schools in the affected locality, although local governments can declare suspensions and cancellations of classes at their own discretion regardless of the warning signal in force.

== List of Philippine typhoons ==
=== Pre–1963 ===
The JTWC was already naming tropical cyclones in the Northwest Pacific basin since 1945, before the Philippines did so. Only a few notable storms persisted before 1963. A tropical cyclone assumably impacted Northern Luzon in July 1911, in which a record-breaking precipitation level was seen in Baguio, with 2,210 mm (87 in) of rainfall being dumped by the storm. In November 1912, a typhoon swept through the central Philippines and "practically destroyed" Tacloban. In Tacloban and Capiz on the island of Panay, the death toll was 15,000, half the population of those cities at the time.

Typhoon Cobra, also known as "Halsey's Typhoon," was a powerful tropical cyclone that struck the U.S. Pacific Third Fleet east of the Philippines in December 1944, resulting in the deaths of 790 sailors.

=== 1963–1999 ===
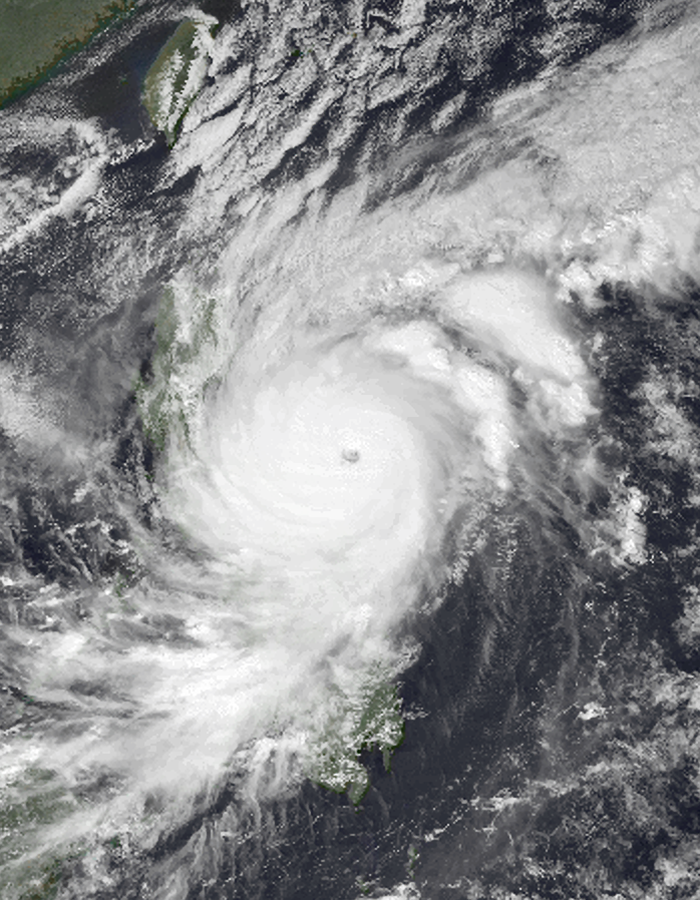
Typhoon Angela (Rosing) prior to landfall in November 1995

In 1963, PAGASA began naming tropical cyclones that enter their area of responsibility using female names ending with "ng". During the period 1963 to 1999, the Philippines experienced several typhoons that affected or made landfall. Moreover, this period saw the most active typhoon season in the Philippines ― with 31 typhoons being named by PAGASA ― in 1993.

This period saw several notable and deadly typhoons that passed anywhere in the country. Typhoon Patsy (Yoling) of 1970 became one of the deadliest typhoons to strike Metro Manila. Typhoon Nina (Sisang) in 1987 became one of the strongest typhoons to hit the Bicol Region. Typhoon Yunya (Diding) in June 1991 struck Luzon at the time of the colossal eruption of Mount Pinatubo. Later in the same year, Tropical Storm Thelma (Uring) became one of the deadliest storms to hit the country, killing just over 5,000 people.

=== 2000–present ===
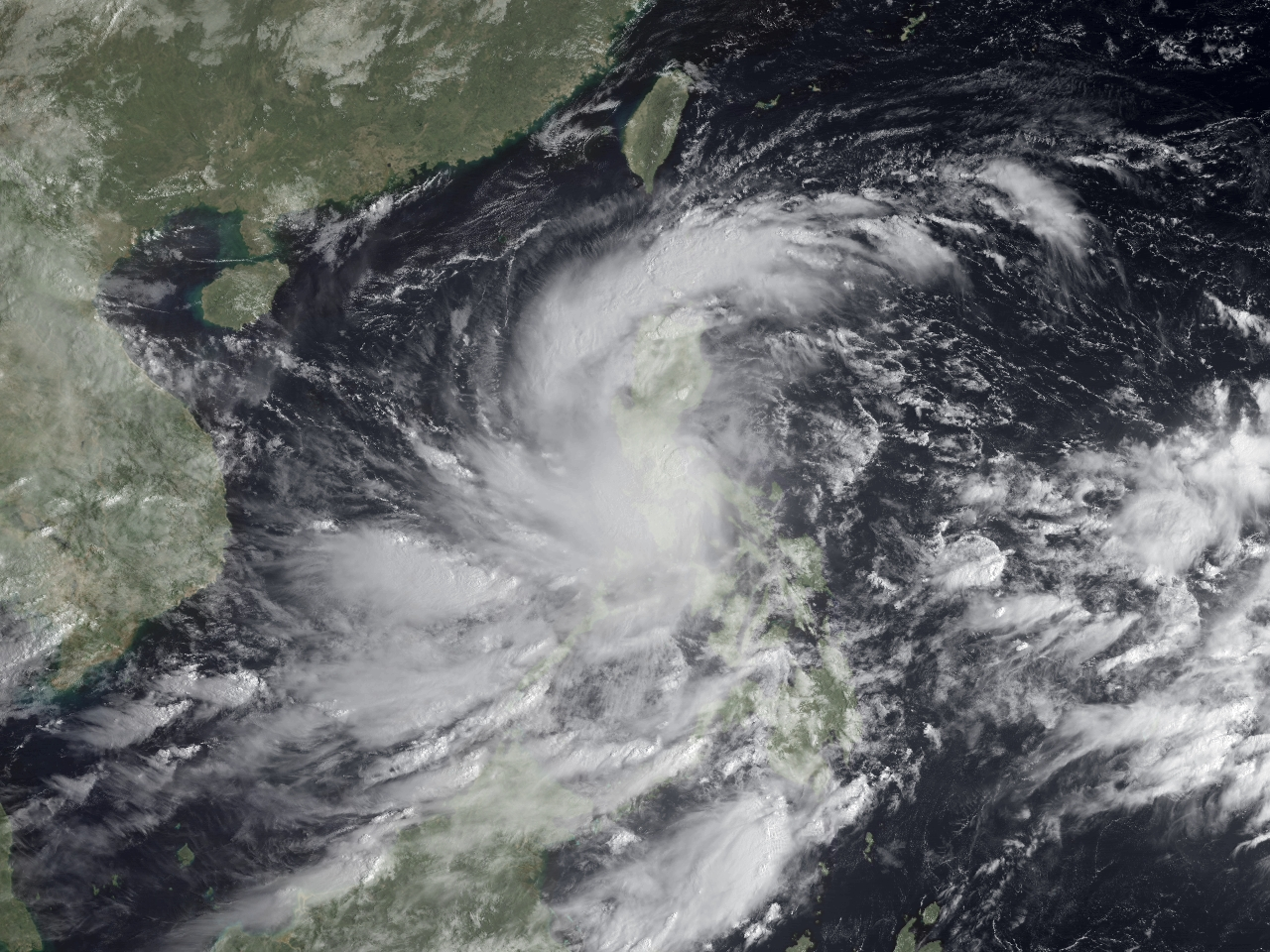
Tropical Storm Ketsana (Ondoy) over the Philippines in September 2009

In the beginning of this period, significant changes were seen in the naming of tropical cyclones in the Northwest Pacific ― the Japan Meteorological Agency (JMA), as the Regional Specialized Meteorological Center (RSMC) of the basin, took over the naming of tropical cyclones by 2000, and the PAGASA revised its naming scheme to contain longer annual lists with a more mixed set of names by 2001. Adjustments in the Philippine cyclone names also occurred in 2005 and in 2021.

The strongest typhoon to make landfall in the country during this time period was Typhoon Goni (Rolly) in early November 2020, with 1-minute sustained winds of 315 km/h (195 mph). Typhoon Haiyan (Yolanda) is the deadliest Philippine typhoon during this period, killing more than 6,300 people. Other notable Philippine storms during this period include Typhoon Ketsana (Ondoy) in September 2009 which became the most devastating tropical cyclone to hit Manila, and Typhoon Bopha (Pablo) in December 2012, which became the strongest typhoon on record to hit Mindanao.

The Philippines is reeling from Typhoon Man-yi (Pepito), which displaced hundreds of thousands, caused widespread destruction, and worsened the impact of recent storms, leaving millions in urgent need of aid and recovery support.

== Deadliest ==
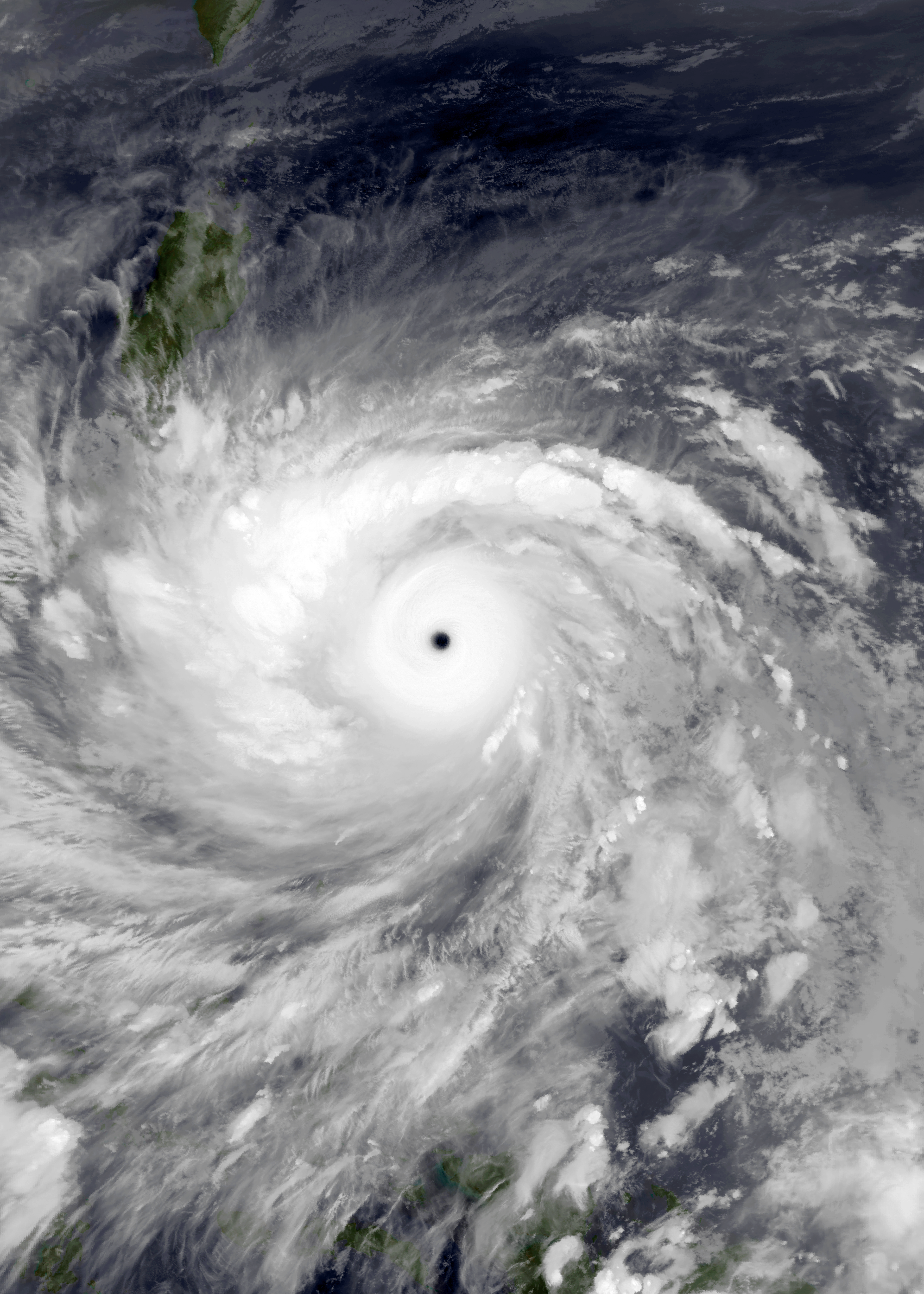
Typhoon Haiyan (Yolanda) while approaching Eastern Samar on November 7, 2013

Deadliest Philippine typhoons
Rank	Storm	Season	Fatalities	Ref.
1	Yolanda (Haiyan)	2013	6,300	
2	Uring (Thelma)	1991	5,101–8,000	
3	Pablo (Bopha)	2012	1,901	
4	"Angela"	1867	1,800	
5	Winnie	2004	1,593	
6	"October 1897"	1897	1,500	
7	Nitang (Ike)	1984	1,426	
8	Reming (Durian)	2006	1,399	
9	Frank (Fengshen)	2008	1,371	(Note: The death and missing columns includes deaths caused by Typhoon Fengshen (Frank), in the MV Princess of the Stars disaster.)
10	Sendong (Washi)	2011	1,292–2,546	

== Wettest ==
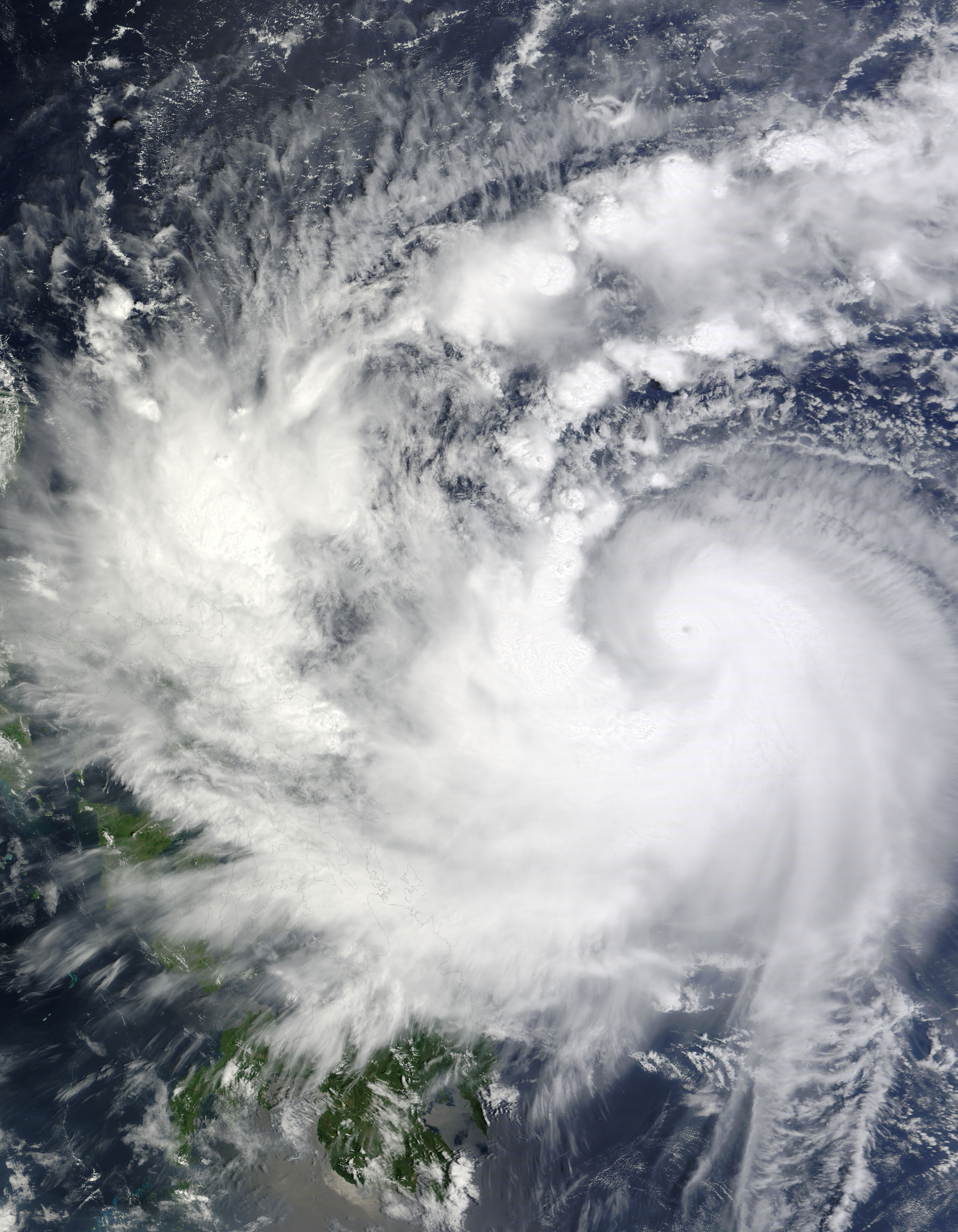
Typhoon Parma (Pepeng) near peak intensity on October 1, 2009

Wettest tropical cyclones and their remnants in the Philippine islands Highest-known totals
Precipitation			Storm	Location	Ref.
Rank	mm	in	Storm	Location	Ref.
1	2210.0	87.01	July 1911 cyclone	Baguio	
2	1854.3	73.00	Pepeng (Parma) (2009)	Baguio	
3	1216.0	47.86	Trining (Carla) (1967)	Baguio	
4	1116.0	43.94	Iliang (Zeb) (1998)	La Trinidad, Benguet	
5	1085.8	42.74	Feria (Utor) (2001)	Baguio	
6	1077.8	42.43	Lando (Koppu) (2015)	Baguio	
7	1012.7	39.87	Igme (Mindulle) (2004)		
8	902.0	35.51	Dante (Kujira) (2009)		
9	879.9	34.64	September 1929 typhoon	Virac, Catanduanes	
10	869.6	34.24	Openg (Dinah) (1977)	Western Luzon	

== Costliest ==
Animated enhanced infrared satellite loop of Typhoon Haiyan from peak intensity to landfall in the Philippines

Costliest Philippine typhoons
Rank	Storm	Season	Damage		Ref.
Rank	Storm	Season	PHP	USD	Ref.
1	Yolanda (Haiyan)	2013	₱95.5 billion	$2.98 billion	
2	Odette (Rai)	2021	₱51.7 billion	$968 million	
3	Glenda (Rammasun)	2014	₱38.6 billion	$771 million	
4	Pablo (Bopha)	2012	₱36.9 billion	$724 million	
5	Ompong (Mangkhut)	2018	₱33.9 billion	$627 million	
6	Pepeng (Parma)	2009	₱27.3 billion	$591 million	
7	Ulysses (Vamco)	2020	₱20.2 billion	$420 million	
8	Crising (Wipha)	2025	₱18.4 billion	$373 million	
9	Kristine (Trami)	2024	₱18.4 billion	$373 million	
10	Rolly (Goni)	2020	₱17.9 billion	$371 million	

== See also ==
- Climate of the Philippines
- 2025 Pacific typhoon season
- 2026 Pacific typhoon season
- List of Pacific typhoon seasons (1939 onwards)
- List of retired Philippine typhoon names

Effects of storms impacting the Philippines:

- Effects of the 2009 Pacific typhoon season in the Philippines
- Effects of the 2013 Pacific typhoon season in the Philippines
