= Typhoon Fengshen =

Pacific typhoon in 2008

Typhoon Fengshen (Frank)
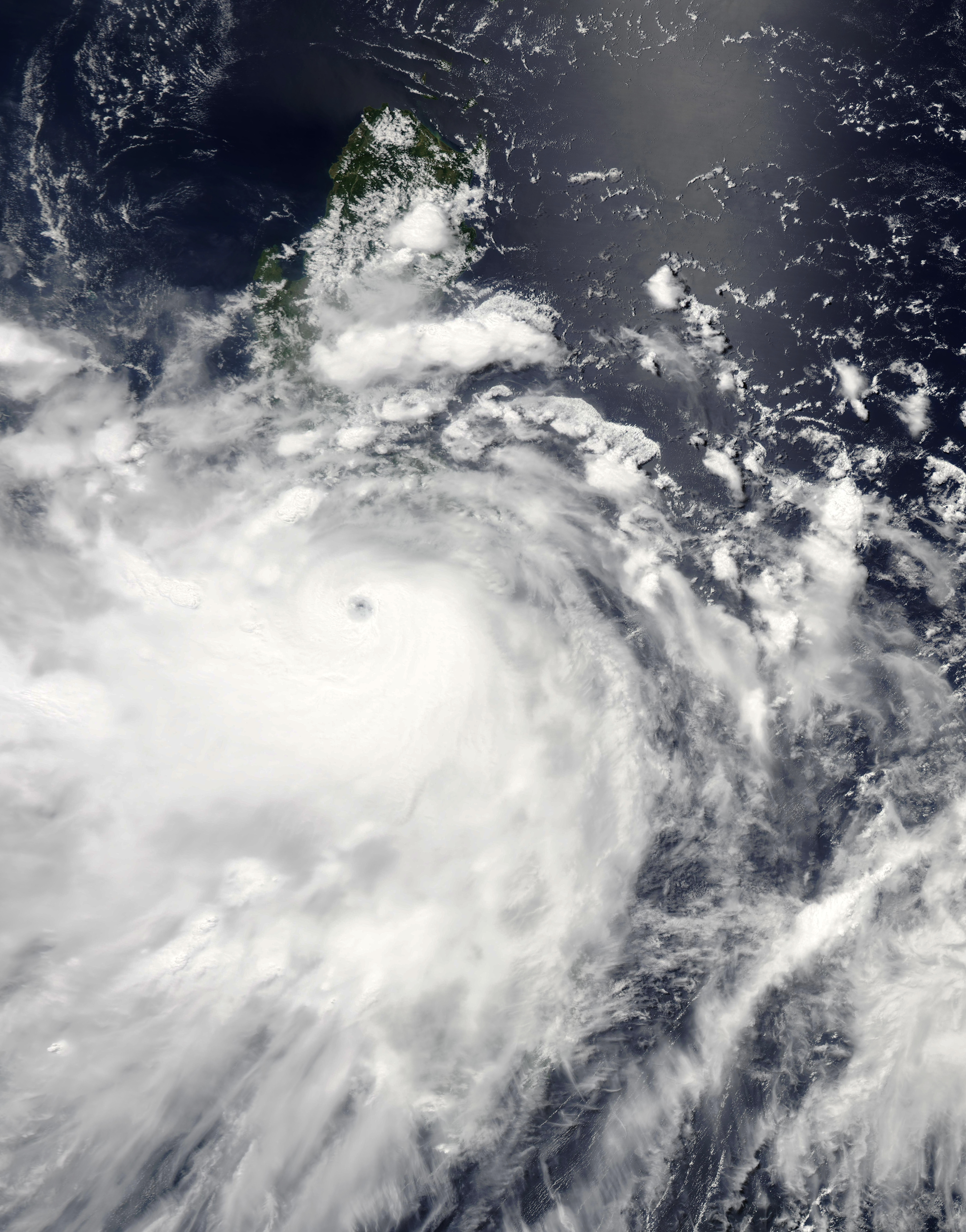
- Typhoon Fengshen at peak intensity on June 21

Meteorological history
- Formed: June 17, 2008
- Dissipated: June 27, 2008

Very strong typhoon
- 10-minute sustained (JMA)
- Highest winds: 165 km/h (105 mph)
- Lowest pressure: 945 hPa (mbar); 27.91 inHg

Category 3-equivalent typhoon
- 1-minute sustained (SSHWS/JTWC)
- Highest winds: 205 km/h (125 mph)
- Lowest pressure: 941 hPa (mbar); 27.79 inHg

Overall effects
- Fatalities: 1,371 total
- Missing: 87
- Damage: $480 million (2008 USD)
- Areas affected: Palau, Philippines, Hong Kong, Macau, Guangdong
- IBTrACS
- Part of the 2008 Pacific typhoon season

Typhoon Fengshen, (Note: The name Fengshen (Mandarin: 风神, [fɤŋ˥ ʂən˧˥]) was contributed by China and literally means "God of wind" in Mandarin.) known in the Philippines as Typhoon Frank, was the deadliest typhoon to hit the Philippines since Typhoon Durian in 2006. It was the sixth named storm and the fourth typhoon recognised by the Japan Meteorological Agency (JMA). The Joint Typhoon Warning Center (JTWC) recognised Fengshen as the seventh tropical depression, the sixth tropical storm, and fifth typhoon of the 2008 Pacific typhoon season.

Fengshen made a direct hit on the Philippines and China, causing severe damage and resulted in at least 1,371 deaths and leaving 87 people missing. Most of the deaths occurred in the Philippines, including 846 of the 922 people on board the Princess of the Stars who were killed when the ship capsized. Despite the high death toll, the name Fengshen was not retired, although its Philippine name, Frank, was retired after the season.

== Meteorological history ==
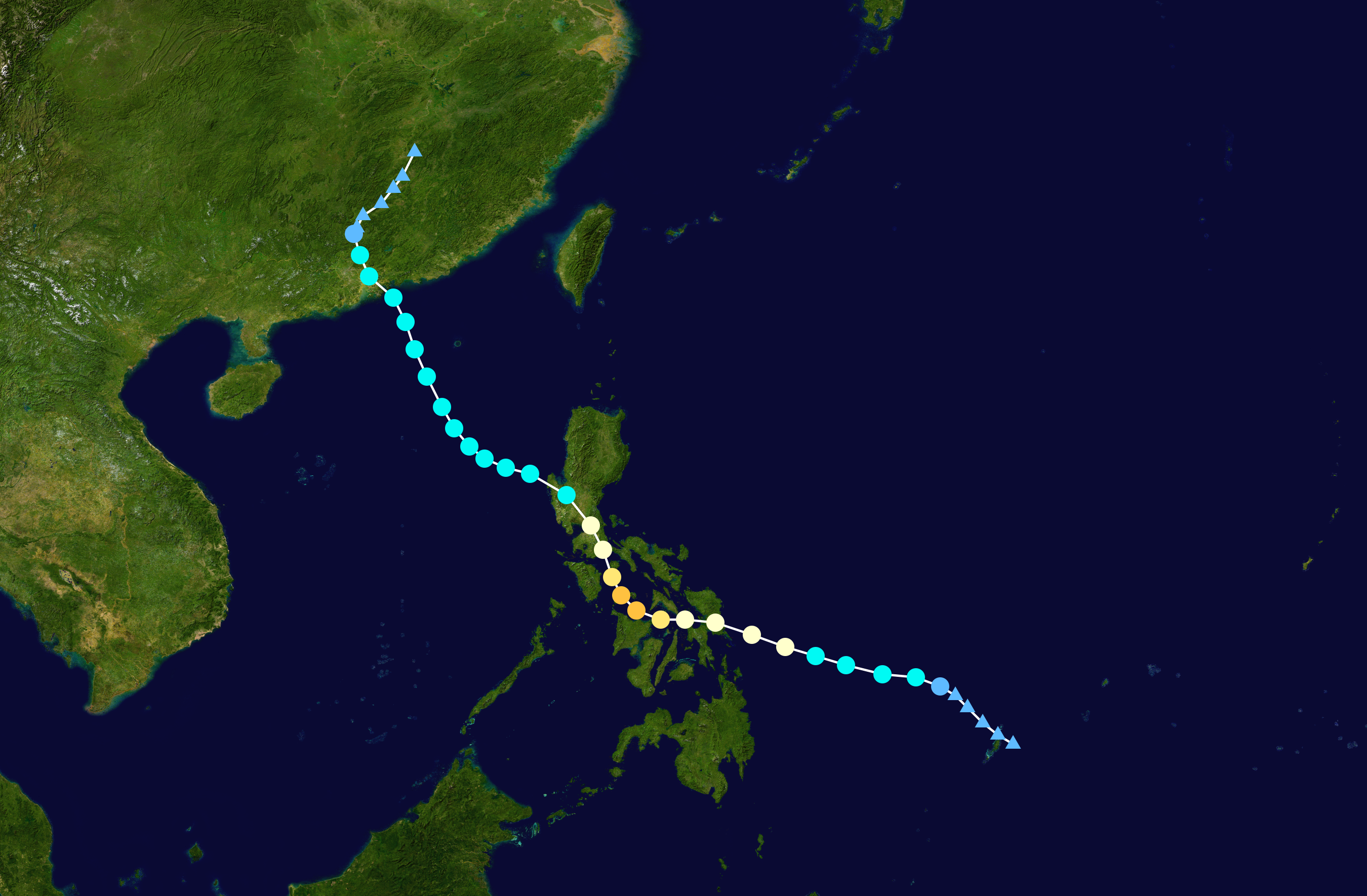
Map plotting the storm's track and intensity, according to the Saffir–Simpson scale Map key Saffir–Simpson scale Tropical depression (≤38 mph, ≤62 km/h) Tropical storm (39–73 mph, 63–118 km/h) Category 1 (74–95 mph, 119–153 km/h) Category 2 (96–110 mph, 154–177 km/h) Category 3 (111–129 mph, 178–208 km/h) Category 4 (130–156 mph, 209–251 km/h) Category 5 (≥157 mph, ≥252 km/h) Unknown Storm type Tropical cyclone Subtropical cyclone Extratropical cyclone, remnant low, tropical disturbance, or monsoon depression

On June 17, 2008, the Japan Meteorological Agency (JMA) started to monitor a tropical depression that had developed about 115 km (70 mi) to the north-west of Melekeok, Palau. Later that day the Joint Typhoon Warning Center (JTWC) issued a Tropical Cyclone Formation Alert as convective banding had continued to consolidate around the low level circulation centre. Early the next day the Philippine Atmospheric, Geophysical and Astronomical Services Administration (PAGASA) named the depression as Frank. The JTWC then designated Frank as Tropical Depression 07W later that day whilst Frank was positioned to the south of a low level subtropical ridge of low pressure. Later that day the JTWC reported that Frank had intensified into a Tropical Storm. Early on June 19, the JMA upgraded Frank to a tropical storm and named Fengshen.

Later that day, Fengshen began intensifying rapidly, becoming a Severe Tropical Storm, after which both the JMA and the JTWC upgraded Fengshen to a Typhoon. Early the next day Fengshen made its first landfall on Samar Island in the Philippines. As Fengshen moved towards the northwest, it continued to intensify.

Fengshen was initially forecast to pass through the Bicol Region but later shifted its course further westward, eventually heading towards the direction of Mindoro Province. However, before even reaching Mindoro or specifically over the coastal waters of northern Panay, it again shifted its direction northwards towards the direction of Metro Manila, mainly because of the weakening of the high pressure area in the northern part of the Philippines.

Fengshen passed Metro Manila between 5 am and 6 am on Sunday with winds of 165 km/h, This was confirmed by eyewitness reports of the weather becoming suddenly calm after strong winds and rains in Quezon City, Marikina, and other nearby areas.

Typhoon Fengshen, after creating havoc in the Philippines, travelled through the South China Sea early on June 23 and was heading northwards towards China. Soon after moving into the South China Sea, the JMA and PAGASA downgraded it to a severe tropical storm while the JTWC downgraded Fengshen from a typhoon to a tropical storm. PAGASA then issued its final advisory on Fengshen due to the storm leaving PAGASA's Area of Responsibility.

Around June 24 22:00 UTC, Tropical Storm Fengshen made landfall on Shenzhen, Guangdong, entering Mainland China. The JTWC announced their final warning later that day.

=== Forecasting errors ===
Typhoon Fengshen was poorly forecasted throughout its lifetime, with all of the forecasts predicting that Fengshen would track to the northwest and away from the Philippines. Instead of this, Fengshen tracked towards the west and affected the Philippines. There also was another error which instead of a continuous westward movement moving away from the Philippines, which, due to a weakening of the subtropical ridge, the storm slowed over Panay and steadily turned northward, lashing the country's northern and central regions.

== Preparations ==
=== Highest Public Storm Warning Signal ===
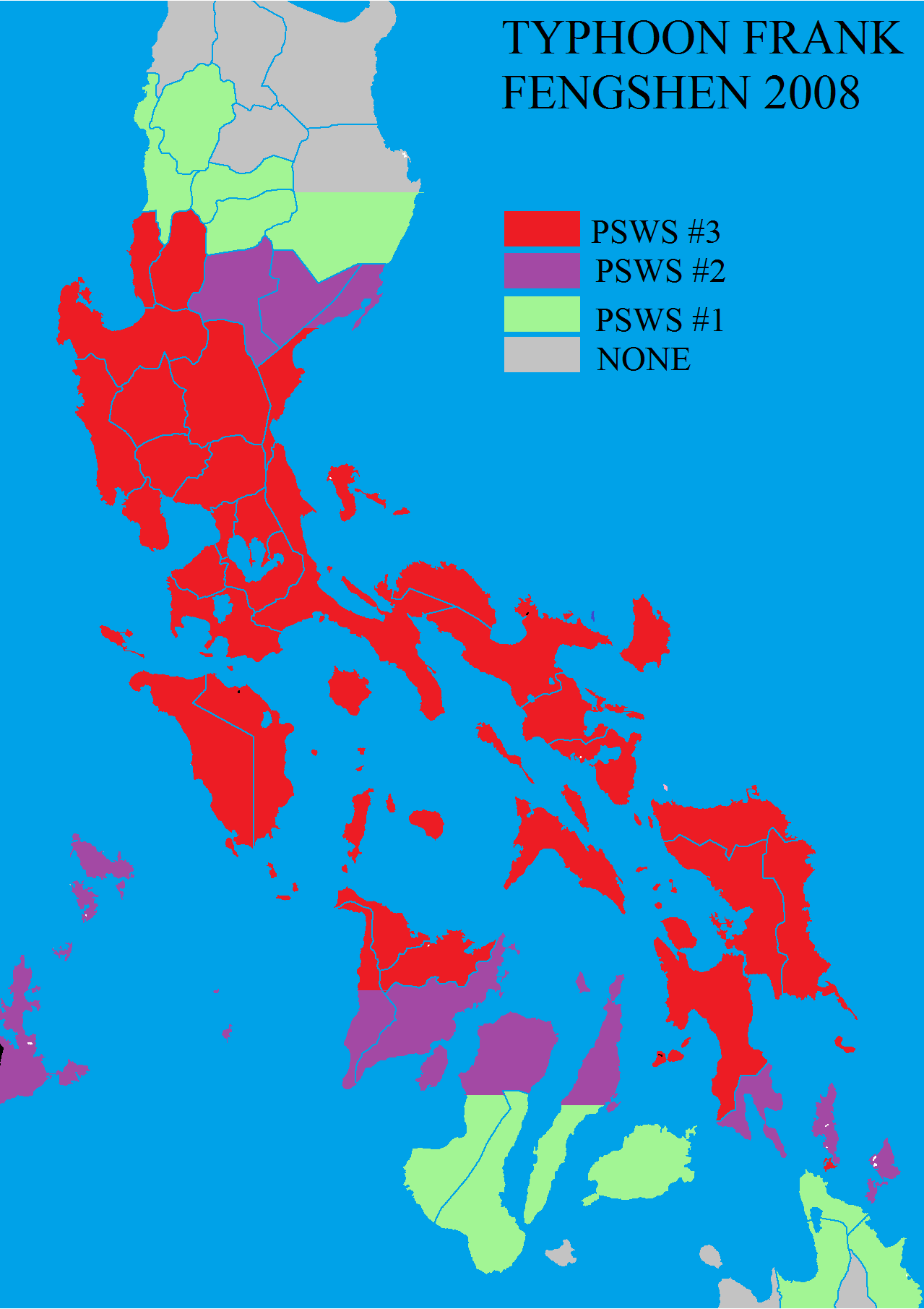
The highest Public Storm Warning Signal raised throughout the country when Frank traversed over the Philippines

| PSWS# | LUZON | VISAYAS | MINDANAO |
|---|---|---|---|
| PSWS #3 | Metro Manila, La Union, Pangasinan, Benguet, Nueva Ecija, Southern Aurora, Zambales, Bataan, Pampanga, Tarlac, Bulacan, Quezon, Polilio Islands, Rizal, Cavite, Laguna, Batangas, Camarines Provinces, Catanduanes, Albay, Sorsogon, Masbate, Burias Islands, Ticao Islands, Romblon, Marinduque, Occidental Mindoro, Oriental Mindoro, Lubang Islands | Samar Provinces, Biliran, Leyte, Aklan, Capiz, Northern Antique | None |
| PSWS #2 | Nueva Vizcaya, Quirino, Rest of Aurora, Northern Palawan, Calamian Islands, Cuyo Islands | Rest of Antique, Iloilo, Guimaras, Northern Negros Occidental, Northern Cebu, Southern Leyte | Dinagat Island, Siargao Island |
| PSWS #1 | Ilocos Sur, Abra, Ifugao, Mountain Province, Southern Isabela, Rest of Palawan | Rest of Negros Occidental, Negros Oriental, Southern Cebu, Bohol | Surigao del Norte, Misamis Oriental, Agusan Del Norte |

From June 20 to June 23, in response to Typhoon Fengshen (Frank) threatening the Philippines, PAGASA at various times issued Public Storm Warning Signal #3 for various parts of Luzon and Visayas as well as Storm Warning Signals 1 & 2 for some parts of Mindanao (specially around the Surigao area). Gradually over the next few days these storm warnings were scaled back as Typhoon Fengshen (Frank) moved through the country.

=== Hong Kong ===
Early on June 23, the Hong Kong Observatory (HKO), hoisted the Standby Signal No.1 for Hong Kong as Fengshen had moved within 500 miles (800 km) of Hong Kong. During the afternoon of June 24 the HKO, cancelled the Standby Signal No.1 and hoisted the Strong Wind Signal No.3. During that evening as Fengshen had continued to strengthen the HKO cancelled the Strong Wind Signal No.3, and replaced it with the Gale or Storm Signal No.8 NE as the gales were coming from the North East quarter of Fengshen. Early the next day two hours after the HKO had issued the Gale or Storm Signal No.8 NE they cancelled it and hoisted the Gale or Storm Signal No.8 NW instead, as the wind were now coming from the northwest. Later that day the HKO cancelled the Gale or Storm Signal No.8 NW and hoisted the Gale or Storm Signal No.8 SW as the winds were now coming from the Southwest. At the same time the HKO issued the Amber Rainstorm warning alongside the Gale or Storm Signal No.8 SW Signal. 45 minutes later the HKO were forced to cancel the amber rainstorm warning and replace it with the red rainstorm warning. The HKO then cancelled the Gale or Storm Signal No.8 SW, later that morning and replaced it with the Strong Wind Signal No.3. All Rainstorm and Typhoon warnings were cancelled later that day.

== Impact ==
=== Philippines ===
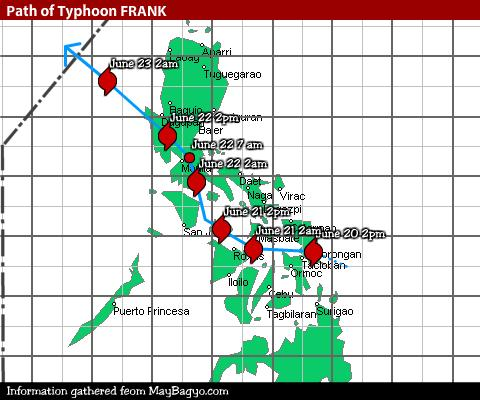
Path of Fengshen (Frank) as it passed through the Philippines. Fengshen reached Metro Manila on the morning of June 22.

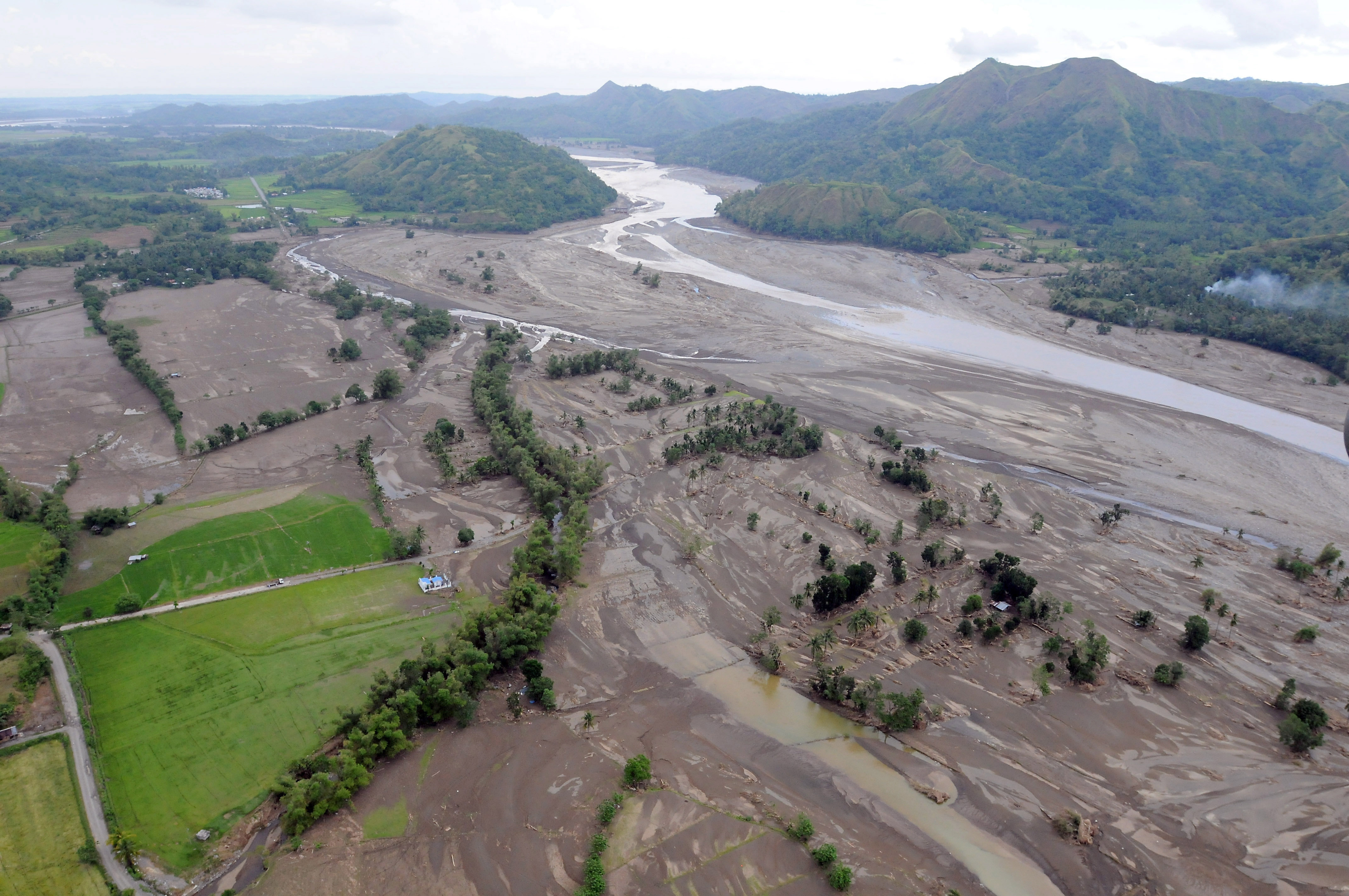
Panay Island was heavily flooded by Fengshen.

At least 598 people were killed by the typhoon as it dropped torrential rain that caused flooding and mudslides in the Philippines, which means that it could be one of the top ten deadliest tropical cyclones in the Philippines. In Iloilo province, 59 are reported killed and 40 missing. In Iloilo City, 30,000 people were forced onto rooftops when a nearby reservoir burst. In the Bicol Region, more than 200,000 people sought temporary shelter from the typhoon. Meanwhile, as the storm passed through Metro Manila and its nearby provinces, it caused widespread power outages which lasted for hours. Typhoon Fengshen could be one of the deadliest typhoons to hit the Philippines, killing over 1,300 people here, mostly from the sinking of the Princess Of The Stars ferry during the storm (for more information on this, see the maritime tragedy article below.)

The Philippine National Disaster Coordinating Council (NDCC) on June 23, 2008, reported that: 98 people died, 115 were missing, 66 were hurt, 99,687 families were affected, 155,564 houses were damaged, 53,706 were totally wrecked, and 109,837 were partially destroyed, in 10 regions, due to typhoon "Frank" as of Monday noon (excluding the MV Princess of the Stars incident). The Philippine National Red Cross placed the death toll at 229. Frank destroyed P 500 million crops amid its P 1.7 billion damage to property in Iloilo. The US responded by donating P 4 million and sent USNS Stockham and US Navy P-3 maritime surveillance aircraftship, for rescue. AFP reported 224 dead and 374 missing (598) as of Monday.

The Philippines National Disaster Coordinating Council (NDCC) reported that "Frank" damaged a total of P 3.2 billion worth of agricultural and fish products and more than 300 schools nationwide (P 212 million). Additional damages to infrastructure were pegged at P 750 million, and fishing boats at P110 million, or a total of P 4.27 billion pesos.

According to the latest NDCC Situation Report on Typhoon Frank (Fengshen), 557 were dead (excluding the deaths in the MV Princess of the Stars), 87 were missing and 826 wounded. Frank affected 4,784,634 persons in 6,377 barangays in 419 municipalities in 58 provinces all over the Philippines. Damages in agriculture amounted to almost PHP 7.542 billion while infrastructural losses made it to around PHP 5.983 billion, which, all in all, totaled to slightly more than PHP 13.525 billion. The most affected areas were Iloilo, Capiz, Aklan and Antique in Panay Island as well as Leyte and Eastern Samar in Region VIII.

==== MV Princess of the Stars ====
A ferry named the Princess of the Stars, capsized near Sibuyan Island in San Fernando, Romblon, and the Philippine Coast Guard was unable to make a rescue attempt because of high waves. A rescue ship reached the MV Princess of the Stars, more than 24 hours after it lost radio contact at 12:30 p.m. EDT (04:30 GMT) on Saturday, 21 June. 864 people were on the ship. There are 56 people that survived. Philippine Coast Guard spokesman Lt. Senior Grade Arman Balilo, however, lamented: "They haven't seen anyone. They're scouring the area. They're studying the direction of the waves to determine where survivors may have drifted."

Xinhua reported that the four survivors witnessed "that the captain of the ship ordered the abandoning of the ship at noon Saturday, but many passengers did not even wear life vests when the ship capsized." Four survivors, Jesus Gica, Oliver Amorin, Jessie Buot, and Renato Lanorio, told GMA news that "the ship did not malfunction, but only slowed down its speed as it encountered big waves off the coast of Romblon." Gica saw many people jump, but "the waves were so big and the rains so strong that few of them could have possibly survived; the crew were so busy saving themselves that they did not care to help the passengers to wear safety vests, and that some of the passengers passed out while children and the elderly failed to wear life vests because they could no longer move when the ship was turning upside down."

San Fernando Mayor Nanette Tansingco confirmed that four others aboard died and hundreds of passengers were still missing. Dozens of people expressed their complaints to the offices of owner Sulpicio Lines, in Cebu and Manila North Harbor in Manila.

The victims' families accused Sulpicio and the Philippine Coast Guard of allowing the ship to set sail despite the bad weather. They further blamed Sulpicio for not personally informing them about the tragedy, the details of the accident, and the condition of the ship and its passengers. Sulpicio's counsel Manuel Espitan, however, stated that "the ship never received advice from Coast Guard, while Metro Manila was still under public storm signal No. 1 when the ship left the port." Despite all these, there are even reports stating that the ferry actually passed the eye of the typhoon directly. BBC quoted President Gloria Macapagal Arroyo as saying: "Why did you allow it to sail and why was there no ample warning? I want answers!"

=== Hong Kong ===
Hong Kong was spared from a direct hit from Typhoon Fengshen. However, it brought torrential rain and caused minor flooding, blocking major roads with fallen trees and signs. At the Hong Kong International Airport, 317 flights were delayed and 26 flights were cancelled. As the Gale or Storm Signal No.8 was raised, Hong Kong Disneyland Resort had to delay opening the park until after the signal had been downgraded to the Strong Wind Signal No.3. However, the No.3 Signal caused all outdoor activities in Hong Kong Disneyland to be stopped.

=== Macau ===
The Strong Wind Signal No.3 was issued in Macau and torrential rain and minor flooding spread throughout the territory. Fengshen caused only minor effects in the territory, including light rainfall. The warning signal was cancelled as the system decayed further.

=== China ===
In Guangdong province, the storm brought heavy rain and strong winds. One report noted: “Tropical storm Fengshen struck China’s south‑eastern coast … bringing new torrential downpours to a region still reeling from heavy rains and deadly flooding since early June.” Up to 17 people were reported killed and another seven were reported missing in press statements. More than 13 000 houses collapsed, and the direct economic loss was estimated at around 1.2 billion yuan.

A separate press release described that strong rain had affected about 340 000 people in one provincial flood‑control headquarters’ account; more than 1,200 houses were destroyed.

== Aftermath ==
Deadliest Philippine typhoons
| Rank | Storm | Season | Fatalities | Ref. |
|---|---|---|---|---|
| 1 | Yolanda (Haiyan) | 2013 | 6,300 | |
| 2 | Uring (Thelma) | 1991 | 5,101–8,000 | |
| 3 | Pablo (Bopha) | 2012 | 1,901 | |
| 4 | "Angela" | 1867 | 1,800 | |
| 5 | Winnie | 2004 | 1,593 | |
| 6 | "October 1897" | 1897 | 1,500 | |
| 7 | Nitang (Ike) | 1984 | 1,426 | |
| 8 | Reming (Durian) | 2006 | 1,399 | |
| 9 | Frank (Fengshen) | 2008 | 1,371 | (Note: The death and missing columns includes deaths caused by Typhoon Fengshen (Frank), in the MV Princess of the Stars disaster.) |
| 10 | Sendong (Washi) | 2011 | 1,292–2,546 | |

=== MV Princess of the Stars ===
The 5-member Philippines Board of Marine Inquiry, in its 65-page report dated August 25, 2008 (submitted to the Maritime Industry Authority or Marina), found Sulpicio Lines and its captain liable for the MV Princess of the Stars June 21 maritime tragedy. The BMI recommended that Marina "consider the suspension of the Certificate of Public Convenience (CPC) of Sulpicio Lines in accordance with existing laws, rules and regulations (and its criminal liability for the sinking)." The final report blamed human error, and ruled that the ship's missing and presumed dead captain, Florencio Marimon, "miscalculated" the risk of continuing the trip to Cebu while the storm raged: "There was a failure of the master to exercise extraordinary diligence and good seamanship thereby committing an error of judgment. The immediate cause of the capsizing of MV Princess of the Stars was the failure of the Master to exercise extraordinary diligence and good seamanship thereby committing an error of judgment that brought MV Princess of the Stars in harm's way into the eye of typhoon Frank or Typhoon Fengshen (2008). It is found negligent for its failure to exercise its duty in ensuring that they transport passengers and cargo safely to (their) destination.”

Sulpicio said 52 survived the tragedy and 312 bodies were recovered of 825 passengers listed. The rest were declared missing and presumed dead. Sulpicio may appeal within 30 days, the Board's recommendation to the Maritime Industry Authority (Philippines) and the Department of Transportation. Meanwhile, cargoes of 5 toxic pesticides and other poisonous substances are still on board the ferry and will be refloated on September. Sulpicio Lines, the 2nd largest cargo carrier in the Philippines, accounts for 40% of all cargo movement across the country.

== Naming ==
This was the second time that the name Fengshen had been used in the Western Pacific, as it had previously been used in the 2002 Pacific typhoon season. Despite the massive loss of life, however, the name Fengshen was not retired.

The name Frank had been used once before by PAGASA, in 2004 it was assigned to Typhoon Conson. Due to the high number of deaths caused by the storm, PAGASA announced that they would be retiring the name Frank at the end of the season from future use within their area of responsibility. The name Ferdie was chosen by PAGASA to replace Frank, which was first used in the 2012 season.

== See also ==
- Weather of 2008
- Tropical cyclones in 2008
- Timeline of the 2008 Pacific typhoon season

Other Philippine tropical cyclones that claimed more than 1,000 lives:

- Typhoon Haiyan (Yolanda, 2013) – deadliest tropical cyclone to strike the Philippines in recent history
- Typhoon Bopha (Pablo, 2012)
- Tropical Storm Washi (Sendong, 2011)
- Typhoon Durian (Reming, 2006)
- Tropical Depression Winnie (2004)
- Tropical Storm Thelma (Uring, 1991) – second deadliest tropical cyclone to strike the Philippines in recent recorded history
- Typhoon Ike (Nitang, 1984)

Other typhoons that also caused widespread damages in the Philippines:

- Typhoon Yunya (Diding, 1991) – strong typhoon that coincided with the 1991 Mount Pinatubo eruption.
- Typhoon Vongfong (Ambo, 2020) – had a similar track to Fengshen.
- Tropical Storm Conson (Jolina, 2021) – a tropical cyclone that almost struck the same areas as Fengshen.
- Tropical Storm Nalgae (Paeng, 2022) – deadly tropical cyclone that also had a similar track to Fengshen.
- Typhoon Doksuri (Egay, 2023) – destructive typhoon that also sunk a passenger boat called MB Aya Express.
- Typhoon Gaemi (Carina, 2024) – didn't make landfall in the Philippines but caused the capsizing of MT Terra Nova.
