= Tropical Storm Washi =

Pacific severe tropical storm in 2011

Severe Tropical Storm Washi (Sendong)
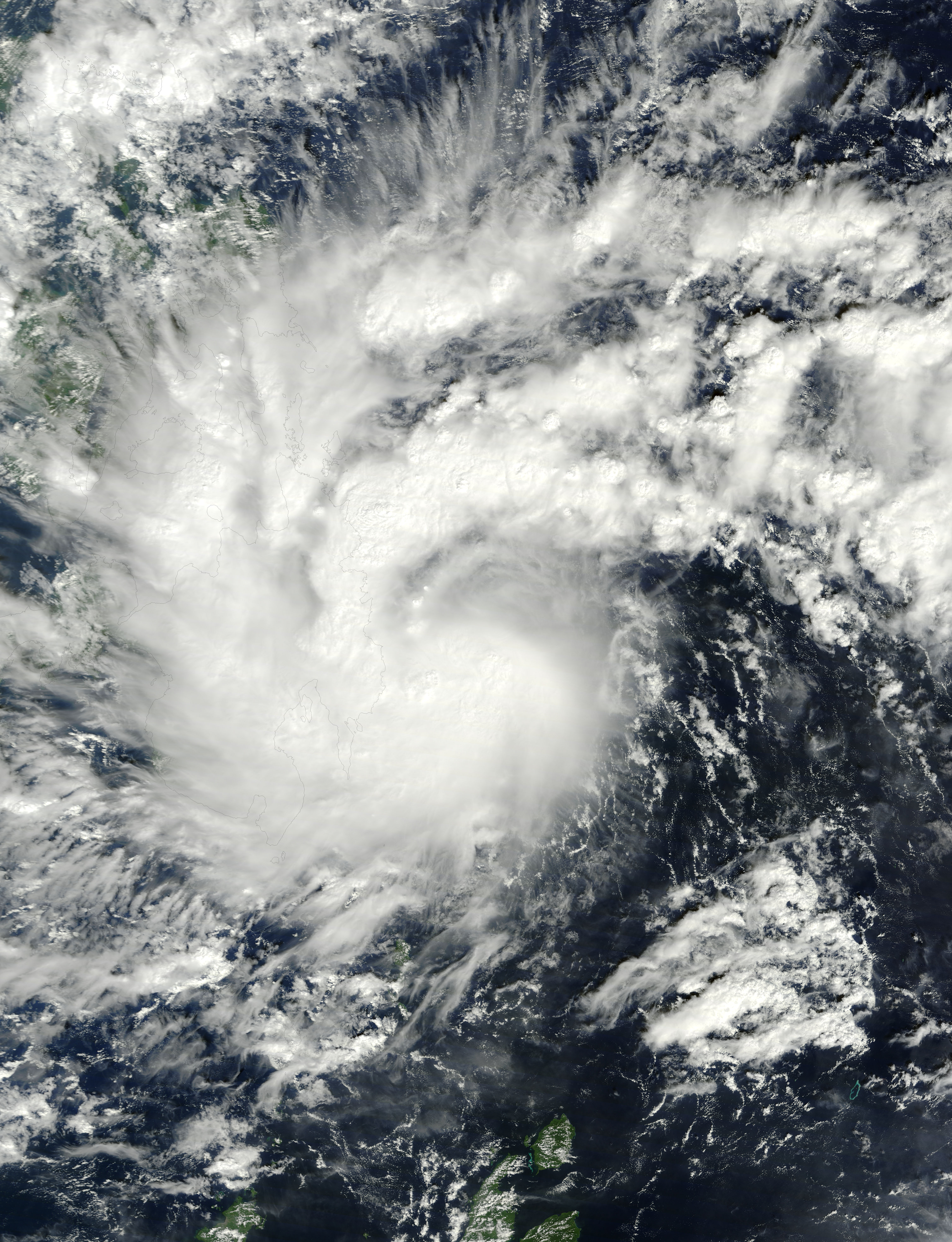
- Severe Tropical Storm Washi approaching Mindanao on December 16

Meteorological history
- Formed: December 13, 2011
- Dissipated: December 19, 2011

Severe tropical storm
- 10-minute sustained (JMA)
- Highest winds: 95 km/h (60 mph)
- Lowest pressure: 992 hPa (mbar); 29.29 inHg

Tropical storm
- 1-minute sustained (SSHWS/JTWC)
- Highest winds: 95 km/h (60 mph)
- Lowest pressure: 985 hPa (mbar); 29.09 inHg

Overall effects
- Fatalities: 1,292–2,546
- Injuries: 6,071
- Missing: 1,049
- Damage: $97.8 million (2011 USD)
- Areas affected: Caroline Islands, Philippines
- IBTrACS
- Part of the 2011 Pacific typhoon season

Severe Tropical Storm Washi, (Note: The name Washi (Japanese: ワシ, [β̞a̠ɕi]) was contributed by Japan and refers to the constellation Aquila, the eagle, in Japanese.) locally named Sendong, (Note: The Japan Meteorological Agency (JMA) assigns names to typhoons in the western Pacific Ocean and north of the equator, as the Regional Specialized Meteorological Centre. PAGASA assigns local names to tropical cyclones in the Philippine Area of Responsibility.) was a late-season tropical cyclone that caused around 1,200 to 2,500 deaths and catastrophic damage in the Philippines in late 2011. Washi made landfall over Mindanao, a major region in the Philippines, on December 16. Washi weakened slightly after passing Mindanao, but regained strength in the Sulu Sea, and made landfall again over Palawan on December 17.

== Meteorological history ==
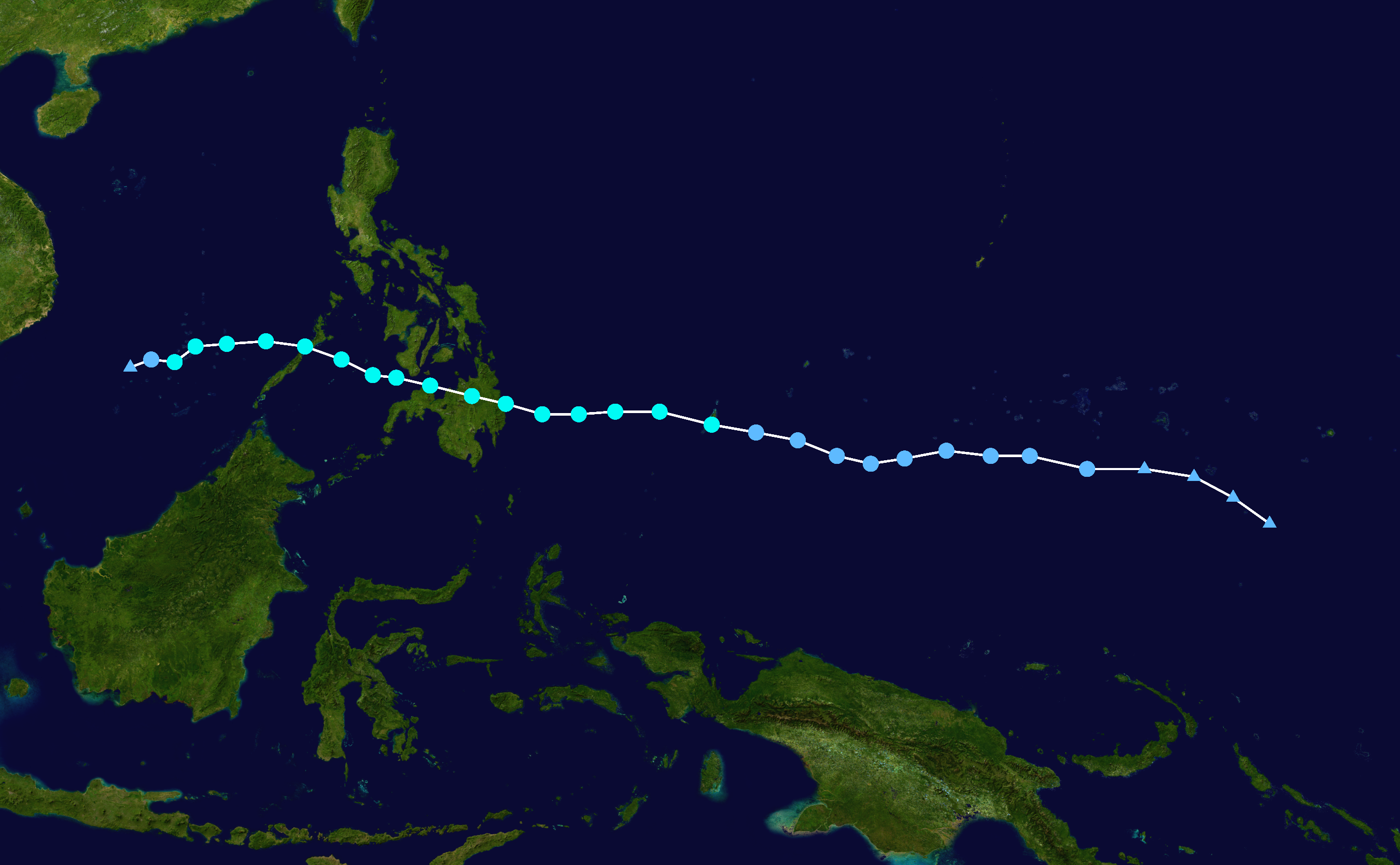
Map plotting the storm's track and intensity, according to the Saffir–Simpson scale Map key Saffir–Simpson scale Tropical depression (≤38 mph, ≤62 km/h) Tropical storm (39–73 mph, 63–118 km/h) Category 1 (74–95 mph, 119–153 km/h) Category 2 (96–110 mph, 154–177 km/h) Category 3 (111–129 mph, 178–208 km/h) Category 4 (130–156 mph, 209–251 km/h) Category 5 (≥157 mph, ≥252 km/h) Unknown Storm type Tropical cyclone Subtropical cyclone Extratropical cyclone, remnant low, tropical disturbance, or monsoon depression

On December 12, the Joint Typhoon Warning Center (JTWC) noted that a developing area of low pressure had persisted about 945 km (585 mi) south-southeast of Guam. Situated along the southern edge of a subtropical ridge, the system tracked steadily westward towards the Philippines. Located within a region of good diffluence and moderate wind shear, deep convection was able to maintain itself over the circulation. Development of banding features and improvement of outflow indicated strengthening was likely. Further development over the following day prompted the JTWC to issue a Tropical Cyclone Formation Alert early on December 13. Less than six hours later, both the JTWC and the Japan Meteorological Agency (JMA) classified the system as a tropical depression, with the former assigning the identifier 27W. Maintaining a westward track, the depression was forecast to intensify slowly over the following three days. For much of December 13, a slight increase in shear displaced thunderstorm activity from the center of the depression, delaying intensification. By December 14, convection redeveloped over the low and the JTWC subsequently assessed the system to have attained tropical storm status.

Early on December 15, the system crossed west of 135°E and entered the Philippine Atmospheric, Geophysical and Astronomical Services Administration's (PAGASA) area of responsibility. Upon doing so, PAGASA began issuing advisories and assigned the cyclone with the local name Sendong. Shortly thereafter, the storm passed close to or over Palau. By 0600 UTC, the JMA upgraded the system to tropical storm status, at which time they assigned it with the name Washi. Maintaining a rapid westward track, Washi slowly became more organized, with low-level inflow improving during the latter part of December 15. On December 16, Washi reached its peak strength as a severe tropical storm and made its first landfall along the east coast of Mindanao.

After passing Mindanao, Washi weakened due to land interaction, but the storm quickly regained its strength, in the Sulu Sea. Late on December 17, Washi crossed Palawan and arrived in the South China Sea, and the system moved out of the PAR on December 18. Washi weakened to a tropical depression and dissipated on December 19, because of cool, dry air, in association with the Northeast Monsoon.

== Impact ==
=== Highest Public Storm Warning Signal ===
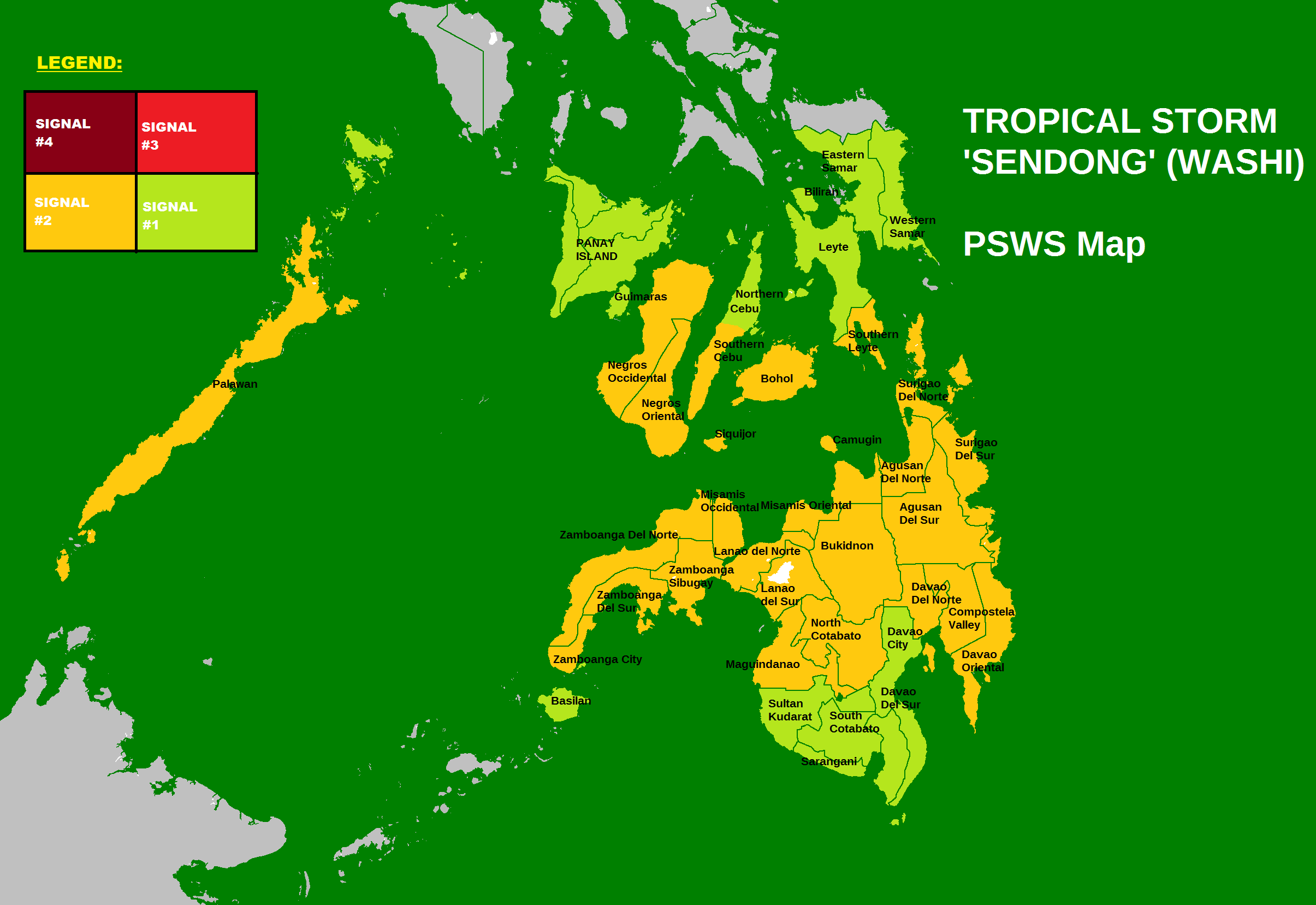
PSWS map Durning the passage of Tropical Storm Washi (Sendong)

PSWS#	Luzon	Visayas	Mindanao
2	Palawan	Southern Leyte, Bohol, Southern portion of Cebu, Camotes Islands, Southern portion of Negros Oriental, Southern Portion of Negros Occidental, Siquijor	Surigao del Norte, Siargao Island, Surigao del Sur, Dinagat Province, Agusan del Norte, Agusan del Sur, Davao del Norte, Davao Oriental, Samal Island, Lanao del Norte, Lanao del Sur, Misamis Occidental, Misamis Oriental, Zamboanga del Norte, Zamboanga del Sur, Zamboanga Sibugay, North Cotabato, Compostela Valley, Camiguin, Bukidnon, Maguindanao
1	Masbate, Sorsogon, Ticao Islands, Cuyo Islands, Coron	Eastern Samar, Western portion of Samar, Northern portion of Leyte, Rest of Cebu, Rest of Negros Oriental, Rest of Negros Occidental, Capiz, Antique, Aklan, Iloilo, Guimaras	Davao del Sur, South Cotabato, Sultan Kuldarat, Sarangani, Basilan

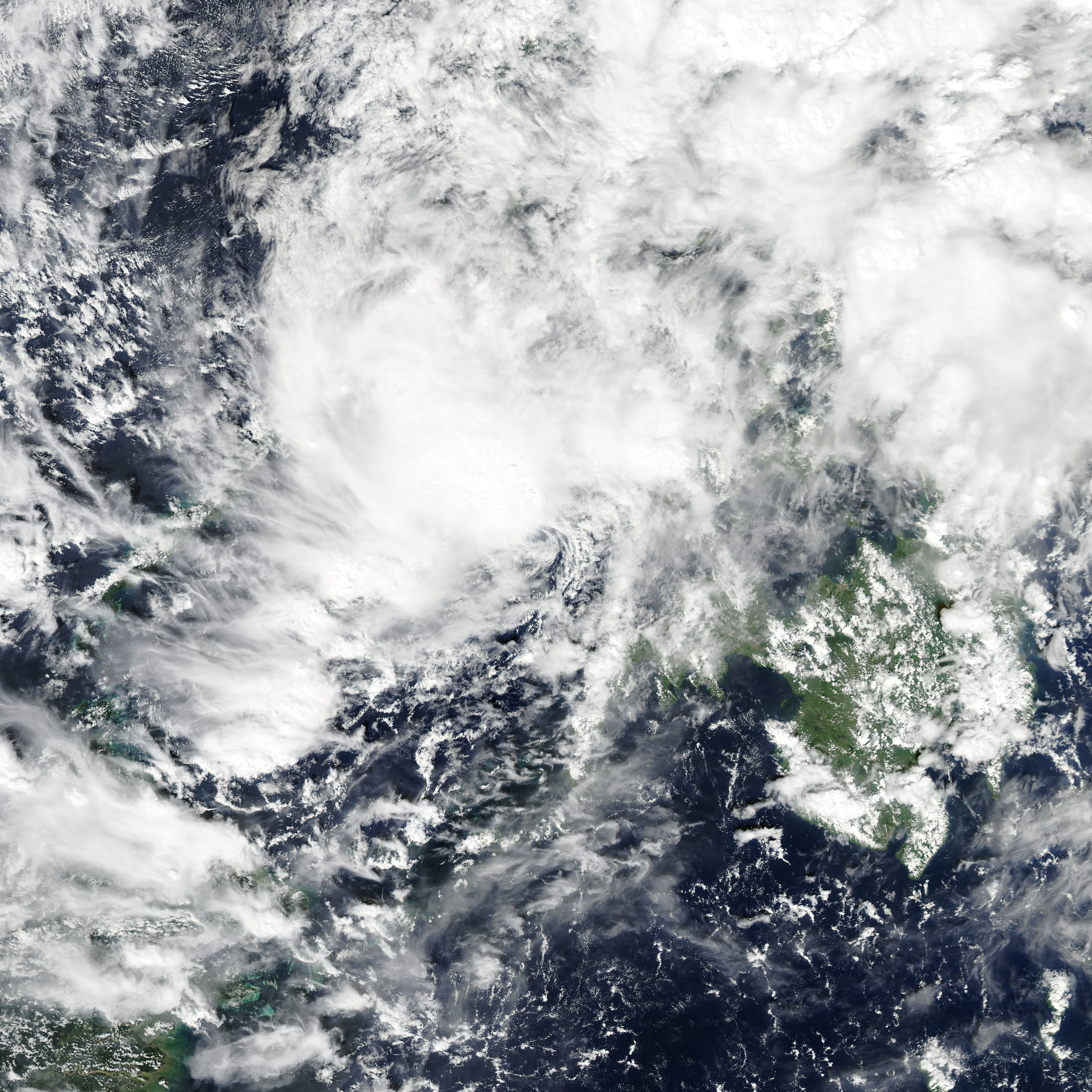
Tropical Storm Washi in the Sulu Sea on December 17

Across the Cagayan de Oro river basin, a localized heavy rain event occurred during Tropical Storm Washi's passage. Onshore flow from Macajalar Bay, which the Cagayan de Oro river drains into, ran into the steep terrain of Mount Makaturing, Mount Kalatungan, and Mount Kitanglad, resulting in orographic enhancement of precipitation. A weather station in Capehan located along the Bubunawan river, a tributary of the Cagayan de Oro river, recorded 475 mm (18.7 in) over a 24‑hour span. The rainfall event itself amounted to a 1-in-20 year event for much of Misamis Oriental. In the span of 24 hours, 180.9 mm (7.12 in) of rain fell at Lumbia which equates to more than 60 percent of their average December precipitation. Estimates from the Tropical Rainfall Measuring Mission jointly run by NASA and JAXA indicated that accumulations around the Cagayan de Oro river exceeded 400 mm (16 in). Observations from Talakag captured the sheer intensity of rainfall associated with Washi, with hourly accumulations peaking at 60.6 mm (2.39 in). Similar amounts, though less anomalous in magnitude, fell farther east on Mindanao. Satellite estimates indicated accumulations of 200 to 250 mm (7.9 to 9.8 in) along coastal areas near where Washi made landfall. A total of 180.4 mm (7.10 in) was observed in Hinatuan.

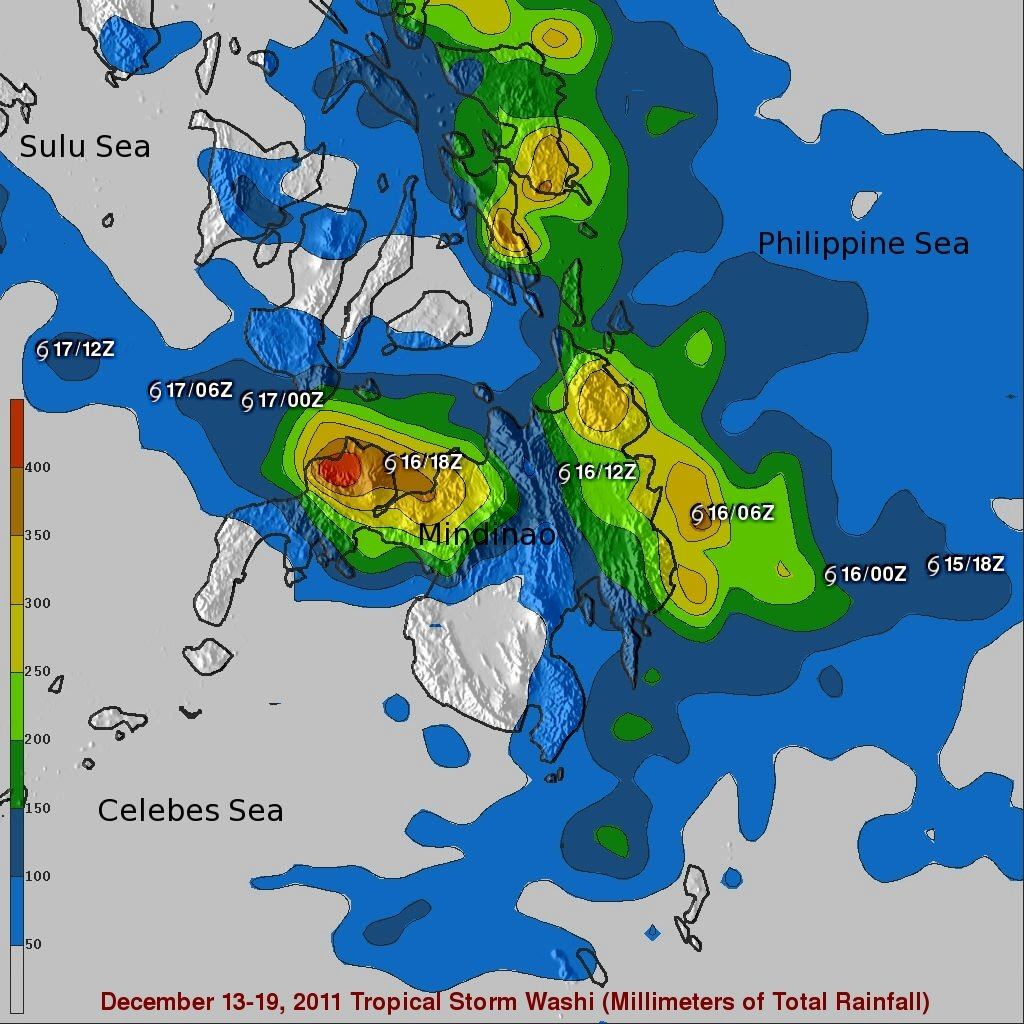
Satellite estimated rainfall from Severe Tropical Storm Washi over the Philippines. The areas in red indicate where more than 400 mm (16 in) of rain may have fallen.

Starting in tributaries and later reaching the main Cagayan de Oro, Iponan, and Mandulog rivers, flash flooding manifested at a dramatic pace. In some locations, flood waters rose by 3.3 m (11 ft) in less than an hour. Alongside the effects from rainfall, high tide at Macajalar Bay further enhanced the flood event and allowed water to inundate areas that would have otherwise safe at low tide. The rivers crested at 7 to 9 m (23 to 30 ft), amounting to a 75-year flood event in some areas, with catastrophic results. This was also far higher than the previous flood event following Tropical Depression Auring in January 2009. Located outside the main "typhoon belt," residents in the affected areas suffered from a false sense of security with tropical cyclone related disasters. Flooding from the rivers struck at approximately 2:30 a.m. local time, when most people were asleep and unable to hear warnings from PAGASA. Hardest hit were the cities of Cagayan de Oro and Iligan where tremendous loss of life occurred. Within Cagayan de Oro, the barangay of Balulang, Carmen and Macasandig was virtually wiped out. Between the two cities, 1,147 people lost their lives while a further 1,993 sustained injury. Residents affected by these flood waters were forced to seek refuge on their roofs amidst 90 km/h (55 mph) winds. The mayor of Iligan regarded the floods as the worst in the city's history.

Throughout the affected areas, nearly 40,000 homes were damaged of which 11,463 were destroyed. Nearly 700,000 people were affected by the storm. Total casualties attributed to the event are uncertain, with the National Disaster Risk Reduction and Management Council's final report in February 2012 stating 1,268 fatalities, 181 people missing, and 6,071 injuries. A later report by the World Meteorological Organization in December of that year indicated 1,292 deaths, 1,049 missing, and 2,002 injured. The International Federation of Red Cross and Red Crescent Societies stated a total of 2,546 deaths in their final report on August 21, 2013. Damage directly related to the storm amounted to ₱ 2.068 billion (2012 PhP, $48.4 million USD). Over half of the damage was due to damaged roads and bridges. Total socio-economic losses amounted to US$97.8 million.

== Aftermath ==
Deadliest Philippine typhoons
Rank	Storm	Season	Fatalities	Ref.
1	Yolanda (Haiyan)	2013	6,300	
2	Uring (Thelma)	1991	5,101–8,000	
3	Pablo (Bopha)	2012	1,901	
4	"Angela"	1867	1,800	
5	Winnie	2004	1,593	
6	"October 1897"	1897	1,500	
7	Nitang (Ike)	1984	1,426	
8	Reming (Durian)	2006	1,399	
9	Frank (Fengshen)	2008	1,371	(Note: The death and missing columns includes deaths caused by Typhoon Fengshen (Frank), in the MV Princess of the Stars disaster.)
10	Sendong (Washi)	2011	1,292–2,546	

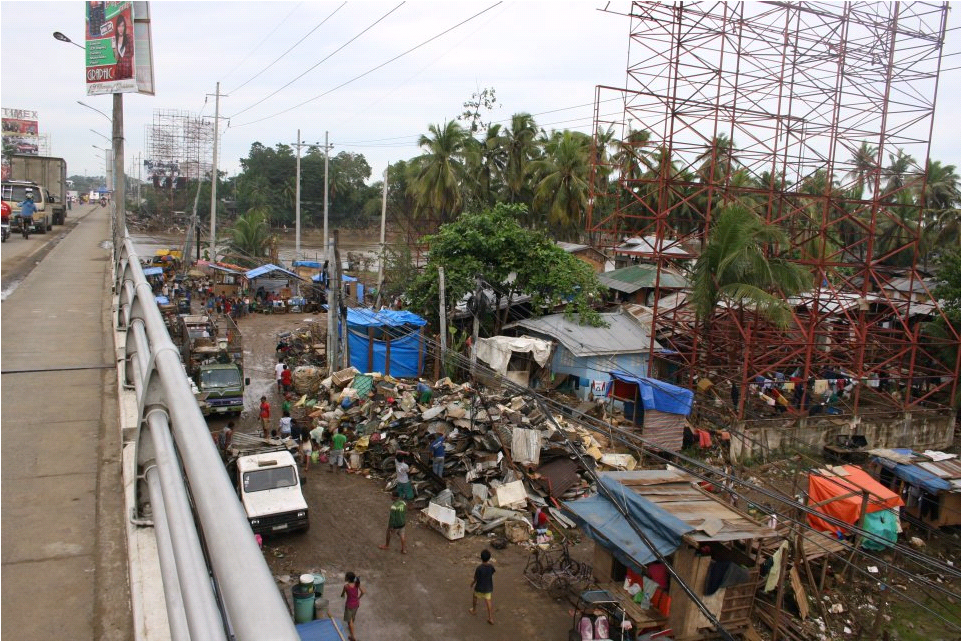
Cagayan de Oro following the aftermath of Tropical Storm Washi

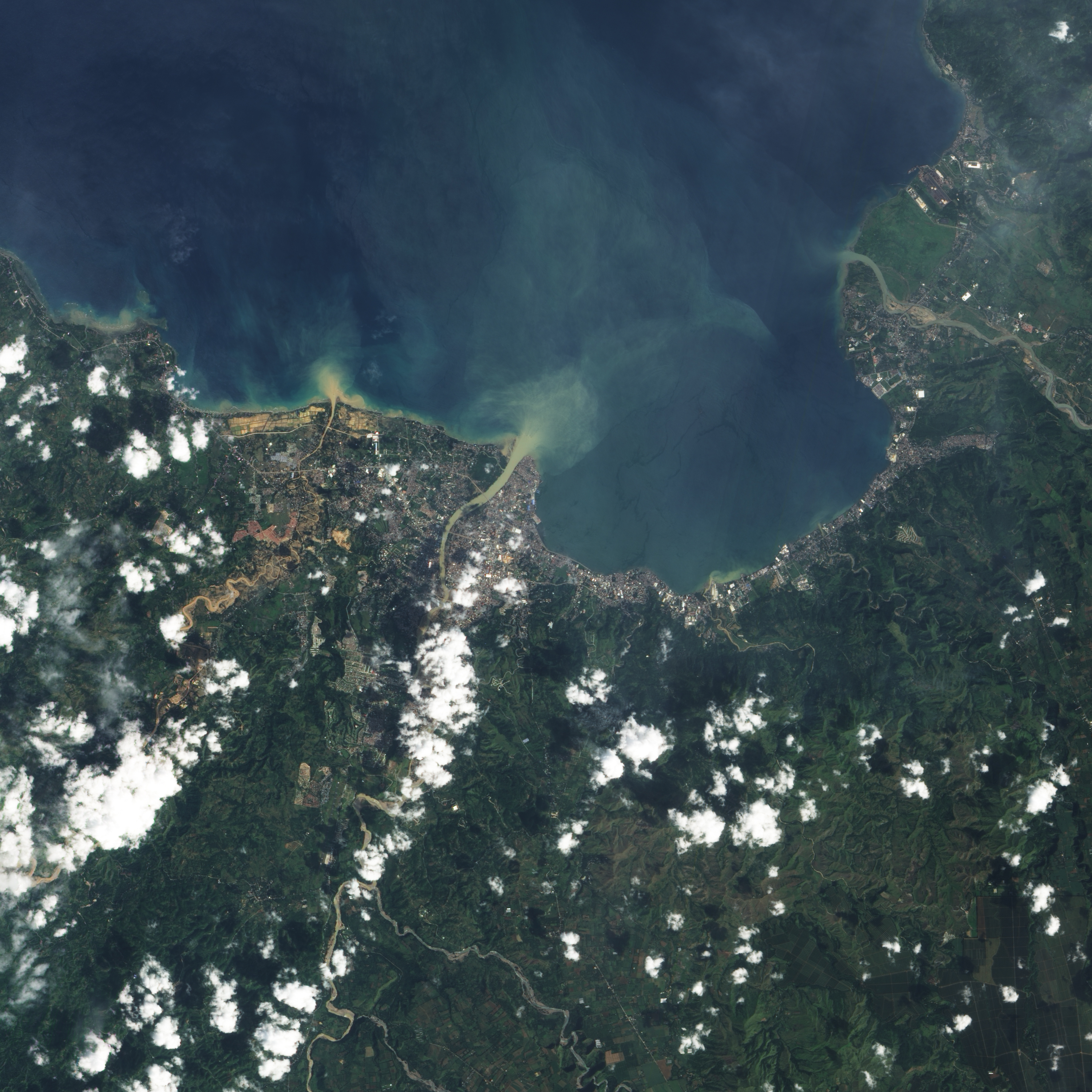
Flooding from Tropical Storm Washi

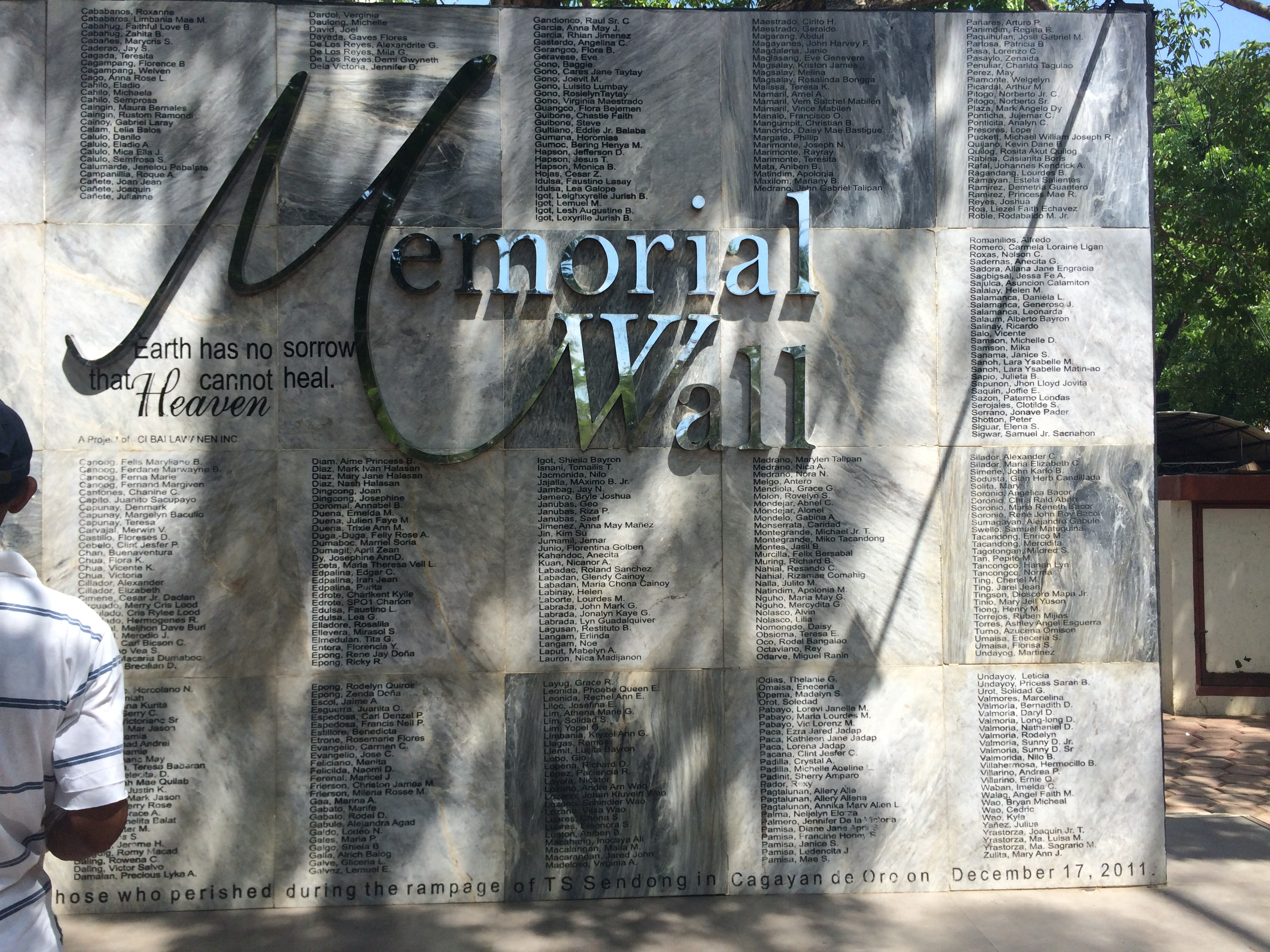
Sendong Memorial Tombstone for the Victims at Gaston Park, Cagayan de Oro

A massive relief operation involving the evacuation of 100,000 people occurred on the morning of December 17, 2011. Approximately 20,000 soldiers were mobilized to assist in recovery efforts and evacuations. The Philippine Coast Guard was dispatched to search for missing people after villages were reported to have been swept out to sea. Sixty people were rescued off the coast of El Salvador, Misamis Oriental and another 120 in the waters near Opol township. President Benigno Aquino III visited Cagayan de Oro and Iligan on December 20, 2011, and declared a state of national calamity in the affected provinces. The President also appealed to its citizens to help the victims in their way of celebrating Christmas in his Christmas Message.

A leptospirosis outbreak in the immediate aftermath infected more than 400 people and killed 22. Additional fatalities from suicide took place in evacuation centers, though exact numbers are unknown.

In the three years following Washi, ₱2.57 billion (US$58 million) was allocated to build 30,438 shelters, designed to withstand winds of 220 km/h (140 mph), in eight regions. Less than half of this total had been built by December 2014, though construction in Cagayan de Oro and Iligan was largely complete. The storm prompted a shift in settlement patterns in Cagayan de Oro, with residents moving away from the areas along the Cagayan River in favor of upland areas.

== International aid and assistance ==
The Australian government provided A$1 million (US$1.01 million) in financial aid. The Danish government provided 300,000 DKK (US$53,000) in emergency funds for relief items such as food, water, sanitation materials, mattresses and blankets. The European Commission allocated €3 million ($3.9 million) to provide emergency relief to tens of thousands of people affected by the storm. The French Government provided €50,000 (US$65,000) in emergency funds. The Government of Indonesia provided $50,000 in financial aid and offered to send search and rescue teams and medical teams. The Japanese government provided 25 million yen (US$320,000) worth of relief goods, such as water tanks and generators, for victims of the storm.

The Government of Malaysia provided $100,000 in financial assistance for relief and rehabilitation. The Chinese government provided $1.1 million in financial aid. The Government of Singapore provided S$50,000 (US$39,000) in funds and S$27,800 (US$22,000) worth of relief goods. The Government of South Korea provided $500,000 in financial aid. Six members of the Swiss Humanitarian Aid Unit were sent to Mindanao to ensure access to clean drinking water. The British Red Cross provided £140,000 (US$220,000) in funds to support relief efforts.

On December 21, the United Nations Emergency Relief Agency released $3 million in funds to improve water and sanitation. On December 22, the United Nations Department of Humanitarian Affairs announced a plan to raise $26.8 million in aid for victims of Severe Tropical Storm Washi. United Nations Secretary-General Ban Ki-moon sympathized with the Philippine Government and stated "the [United Nations] would extend whatever help is needed by those who were affected by the disaster." The United Nations High Commissioner for Refugees also pledged to send 42 metric tons of aid to the country. The United Nations Children's Fund also appealed for $4.2 million to be sent to the Philippines.

The United States provided $100,000 in funds to support relief efforts. The country's ambassador, Harry K. Thomas Jr., expressed his "heartfelt condolences and sympathies" to those affected by the storm. Immediate assistance was to be provided by the United States Agency for International Development's Office of Foreign Disaster Assistance. Non-food items such as hygiene kits, water purification tablets, and containers were to be sent to the Philippines.

== Retirement ==
Due to its high death toll, PAGASA announced that the name, Sendong, would be retired from their tropical cyclone naming lists. It was replaced with Sarah from the 2015 season. However, due to the limited number of typhoons that entered PAR, the name wasn't used and instead was first used in the 2019 season.

In February 2012, the ESCAP/WMO Typhoon Committee announced that Washi would also be retired from its naming lists and was replaced with the name Hato.

== See also ==
- Weather of 2011
- Tropical cyclones in 2011
- 2011 Southeast Asian floods
