= Tropical Depression Winnie =

Pacific tropical depression in 2004

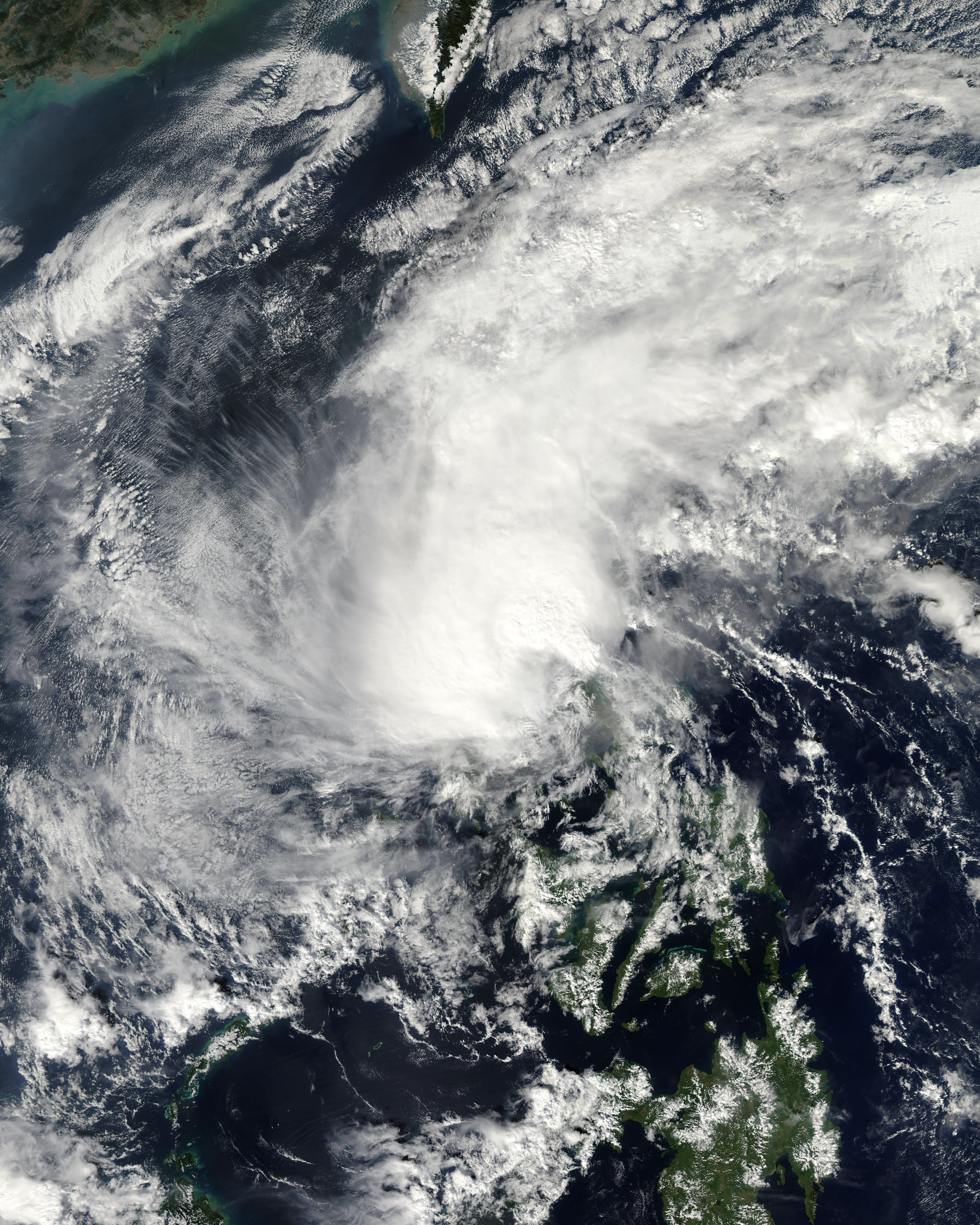
- Tropical Depression Winnie over the Philippines

Meteorological history
- Formed: November 29, 2004
- Dissipated: November 30, 2004

Tropical depression
- 10-minute sustained (JMA)
- Highest winds: 55 km/h (35 mph)
- Lowest pressure: 1000 hPa (mbar); 29.53 inHg

Overall effects
- Fatalities: 1,593 total
- Damage: $14.6 million (2004 USD)
- Areas affected: Philippines
- Part of the 2004 Pacific typhoon season

Tropical Depression Winnie was a short-lived but catastrophic tropical cyclone that killed nearly 1,600 people after triggering widespread flooding in the Philippines in late November 2004. It was the second deadliest tropical cyclone of 2004, only surpassed by Hurricane Jeanne. A depression, which formed east of Samar, brought heavy rain to areas where it passed through, affecting many areas, owing to Winnie’s large cloudiness.

== Meteorological history ==
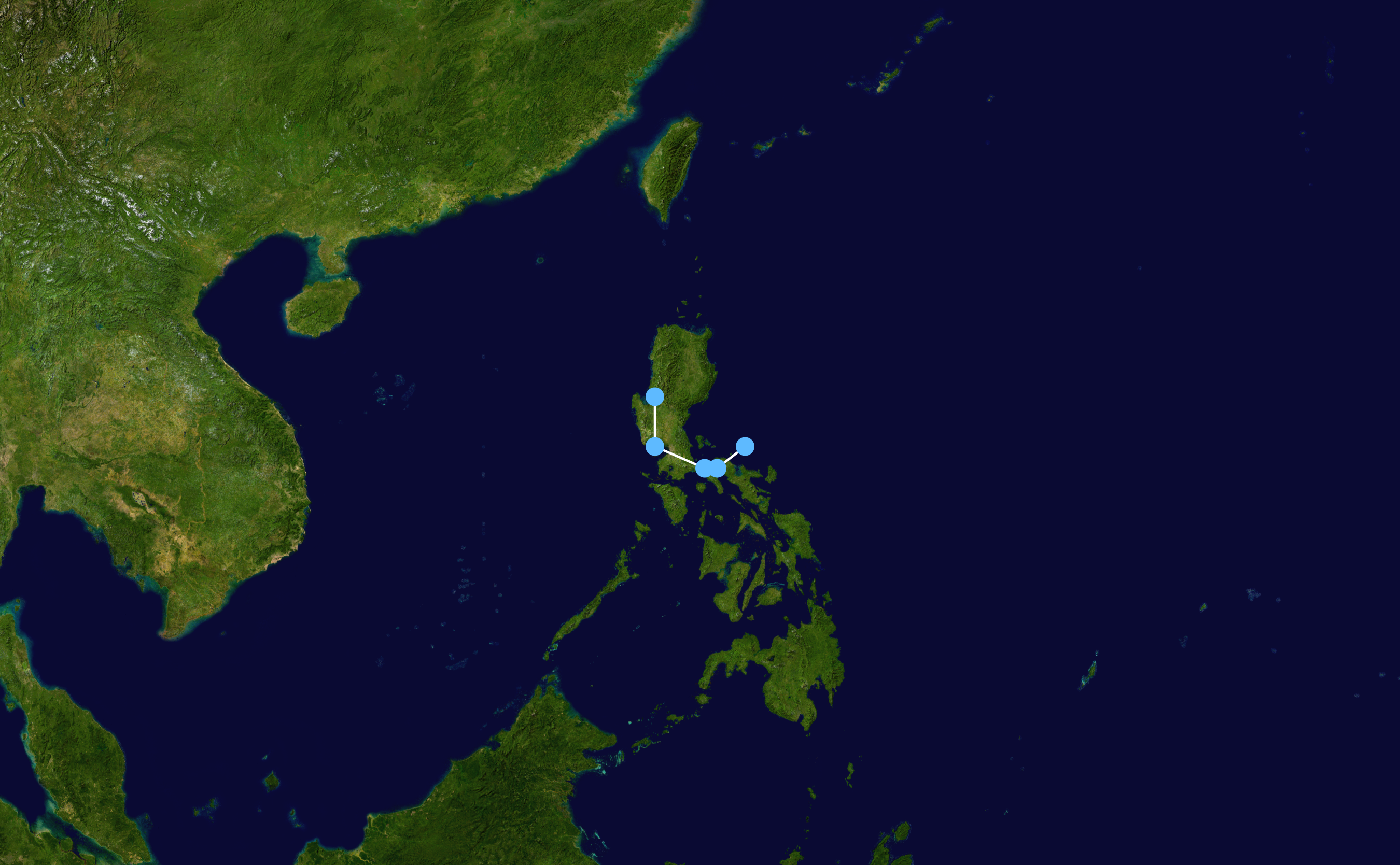
Map plotting the storm's track and intensity, according to the Saffir–Simpson scale Map key Saffir–Simpson scale Tropical depression (≤38 mph, ≤62 km/h) Tropical storm (39–73 mph, 63–118 km/h) Category 1 (74–95 mph, 119–153 km/h) Category 2 (96–110 mph, 154–177 km/h) Category 3 (111–129 mph, 178–208 km/h) Category 4 (130–156 mph, 209–251 km/h) Category 5 (≥157 mph, ≥252 km/h) Unknown Storm type Tropical cyclone Subtropical cyclone Extratropical cyclone, remnant low, tropical disturbance, or monsoon depression

Tropical Depression Winnie was first identified by the Philippine Atmospheric, Geophysical and Astronomical Services Administration on November 27 as a tropical depression east of the Philippines. A poorly organized cyclone, the Joint Typhoon Warning Center briefly issued a Tropical Cyclone Formation Alert on November 29. Tracking west-northwestward, Winnie made landfall in southern Luzon. Upon moving over land, the depression attained its peak intensity with winds of 55 km/h (35 mph) and a barometric pressure of 1000 mbar (hPa; 29.53 inHg). Once over land, the system began to weaken before entering the South China Sea. Once over water, Winnie turned northwest, moving along the western Luzon coastline throughout November 29. Early on the following day, advisories on the tropical depression ceased. Winnie was last noted off the northwestern coast of Luzon, later that day.

== Impact ==
Deadliest Philippine typhoons
Rank	Storm	Season	Fatalities	Ref.
1	Yolanda (Haiyan)	2013	6,300	
2	Uring (Thelma)	1991	5,101–8,000	
3	Pablo (Bopha)	2012	1,901	
4	"Angela"	1867	1,800	
5	Winnie	2004	1,593	
6	"October 1897"	1897	1,500	
7	Nitang (Ike)	1984	1,426	
8	Reming (Durian)	2006	1,399	
9	Frank (Fengshen)	2008	1,371	(Note: The death and missing columns includes deaths caused by Typhoon Fengshen (Frank), in the MV Princess of the Stars disaster.)
10	Sendong (Washi)	2011	1,292–2,546	

Although a weak tropical cyclone, Tropical Depression Winnie brought torrential rainfall to much of the Visayas and Luzon. Initial estimates stated that at least 300 people were killed by the storm. However, over time, it was discovered that at least 842 people perished and 751 others were missing, a total of 1,593 people. Damage from the depression was estimated at 678.7 million Philippine pesos (US$14.6 million).

== Aftermath ==
Not long after Winnie devastated the central Philippines, the country was struck by another, more powerful tropical cyclone. Typhoon Nanmadol worsened the situation caused by Winnie and killed another 77 people.

== Retirement ==
Due to the extreme death toll caused by the storm in the Philippines, the name Winnie was later retired. The name was replaced with Warren from 2008 season.

== See also ==
Other Philippines tropical cyclones that claimed more than 1,000 lives

- Typhoon Bopha (Pablo, 2012)
- Typhoon Haiyan (Yolanda, 2013), deadliest tropical cyclone to strike the Philippines in recent recorded history
- Tropical Storm Washi (Sendong, 2011)
- Typhoon Fengshen (Frank, 2008)
- Typhoon Durian (Reming, 2006)
- Tropical Storm Thelma (Uring, 1991)
- 1881 Haiphong Typhoon
- 1867 Angela Typhoon
