= 1867 Angela typhoon =

Fourth deadliest typhoon in the Philippines

From September 20 to 26, 1867, Manila experienced the full brunt of a storm, which was believed to be a typhoon. Dubbed as the 1867 Angela typhoon, the capital was submerged in floods from the storm. Many ships either disappeared in waters or were destroyed in the shores near Santa Lucia and Tondo, both towns near Manila Bay. The waves on the said bay were described as "mountainous" by some residents near the coast. The Spanish ship that departed from British Hong Kong named "Malaspina" sank near Ilocos, killing an unknown number of passengers and crew with no survivors. The waters of the Abra River overflowed, killing over 1,800 individuals, mostly due to drowning. This would make the typhoon the fourth deadliest tropical cyclone ever to hit the present-day Philippines. No numerical estimate for the damage caused by the storm is available.

== Meteorological history and impact ==
The system likely originated in the waters off the Philippine Sea, far back on September 20. It then started to curve northwestwards, passing over Luzon and emerging into Lingayen Gulf on an unknown date. It then turned westwards and was last noted on September 26 over the waters of the South China Sea, far away from any landmasses. This was recorded as the last known date of the typhoon, despite a barometric pressure report of 737.30 mm (29.027 inHg, 982.96 mbar) in Manila on the early morning of September 27.

The Malacañang Palace, which was the residence of then-governor-general José de la Gándara y Navarro, was isolated due to the floods. The paths leading to the palace were submerged by an overflowed lake, forcing some officials there to use boats to reach the palace. Typhoon-force winds were experienced in the capital and other surrounding areas for over 10 hours. Over seventeen ships were still in Manila Bay when they experienced the fury of the storm. The vessels may have disappeared and/or been wrecked in the shores near the towns of Santa Lucia and Tondo. Residents near the coast on these areas described the waves in the bay as “mountainous”. Some officials and religious institutions provided assistance to residents that could not evacuate during the floods.

Deadliest Philippine typhoons
Rank	Storm	Season	Fatalities	Ref.
1	Yolanda (Haiyan)	2013	6,300	
2	Uring (Thelma)	1991	5,101–8,000	
3	Pablo (Bopha)	2012	1,901	
4	"Angela"	1867	1,800	
5	Winnie	2004	1,593	
6	"October 1897"	1897	1,500	
7	Nitang (Ike)	1984	1,426	
8	Reming (Durian)	2006	1,399	
9	Frank (Fengshen)	2008	1,371	(Note: The death and missing columns includes deaths caused by Typhoon Fengshen (Frank), in the MV Princess of the Stars disaster.)
10	Sendong (Washi)	2011	1,292–2,546	

On September 5, the waters of the Abra River overflowed due to the typhoon, reaching over 25 feet above the spilling level. This tragedy killed over 1,800 individuals of which the majority are due to drowning. It also caused an incalculable amount of damage in crops and livestocks across the Ilocos Region, especially Abra.

A Spanish ship, dubbed as “Malaspina” which had departed on 20th Sep 1867 from British Hong Kong and was traveling to Manila, the Philippines, experienced the full force of the storm and sank, possibly in the South China Sea, on another unknown date. Nothing has been heard from the ship since then and the number of dead remains unknown. As time passed, the families of the victims started to worry and suspicions started to emerge in the country. Some months later, the commandant of the navy yard in Manila started a widespread search for the ill-fated ship, all of which returned with no traces of the large vessel. It was believed that until this day, the history of the ship remained unknown in human knowledge.

== Aftermath ==
After the typhoon's devastation in Luzon, the Ayuntamiento with the consent of Gándara distributed aid amounting to ₱3,000 to the victims of the storm. A royal decree, which was signed on December 21 that year, described that the expenses were approved for recovery processes and the La Direccion de Administracion of the country were instructed to divide the budget for further emergencies.

Five months later, on February 18 of the next year, the Army and Navy of Cavite paid a tribute to the victims of the tragedy and their comrades that were also in that ship. The Santo Domingo Church in the area held a solemn high mass that day, to remember the loss of the passengers and crew of the ill-fated ship.

== See also ==
- 1867 Pacific typhoon season
