= 1860s Pacific typhoon seasons =

This article encompasses the 1860s Pacific typhoon seasons. The list is very incomplete; information on early typhoon seasons is patchy and relies heavily on individual observations of travellers and ships. There were no comprehensive records kept by a central organisation at this early time.

== 1862 season ==
A typhoon struck near Hong Kong on 27 July, killing around 80,000 people.

== 1863 season ==
Four typhoons struck the Philippines in 1863. One of which, a typhoon in December, killed 49 people.

Several Royal Navy vessels reported a typhoon in the East China Sea that moved northeastward through the Ryukyu Islands and to the west of Kyushu on 15–16 August. HMS Euryalus reported a pressure of 990.6 mbar (29.25 inHg) in Kagoshima Bay at 4:00 AM on 16 August, while serving as the flagship of Admiral Sir Augustus Kuper during the bombardment of Kagoshima.

== 1864 season ==
A typhoon in 1864 struck Hong Kong.

== 1865 season ==
There were eight tropical cyclones in the Western Pacific in 1865, seven of which were typhoons.

== 1866 season ==
There were five tropical cyclones that affected the Philippines in 1866, three of which were typhoons. A typhoon in June killed five people, and another typhoon in September killed four people. A northeasterly moving typhoon rolled through western Japan, entered the Sea of Japan, and passed just northwest of Hokkaido on 16 September.

== 1867 season ==
There were five typhoons in the Western Pacific in 1867. A typhoon in September killed 1,800 people when it rose the waters of the Abra River.

== 1868 season ==
There were two typhoons in the Western Pacific in 1868.

== 1869 season ==
There were three tropical cyclones in the Western Pacific in 1869, one of which was a typhoon.
