= List of Philippine typhoons (2000–present) =

List of Philippine typhoons

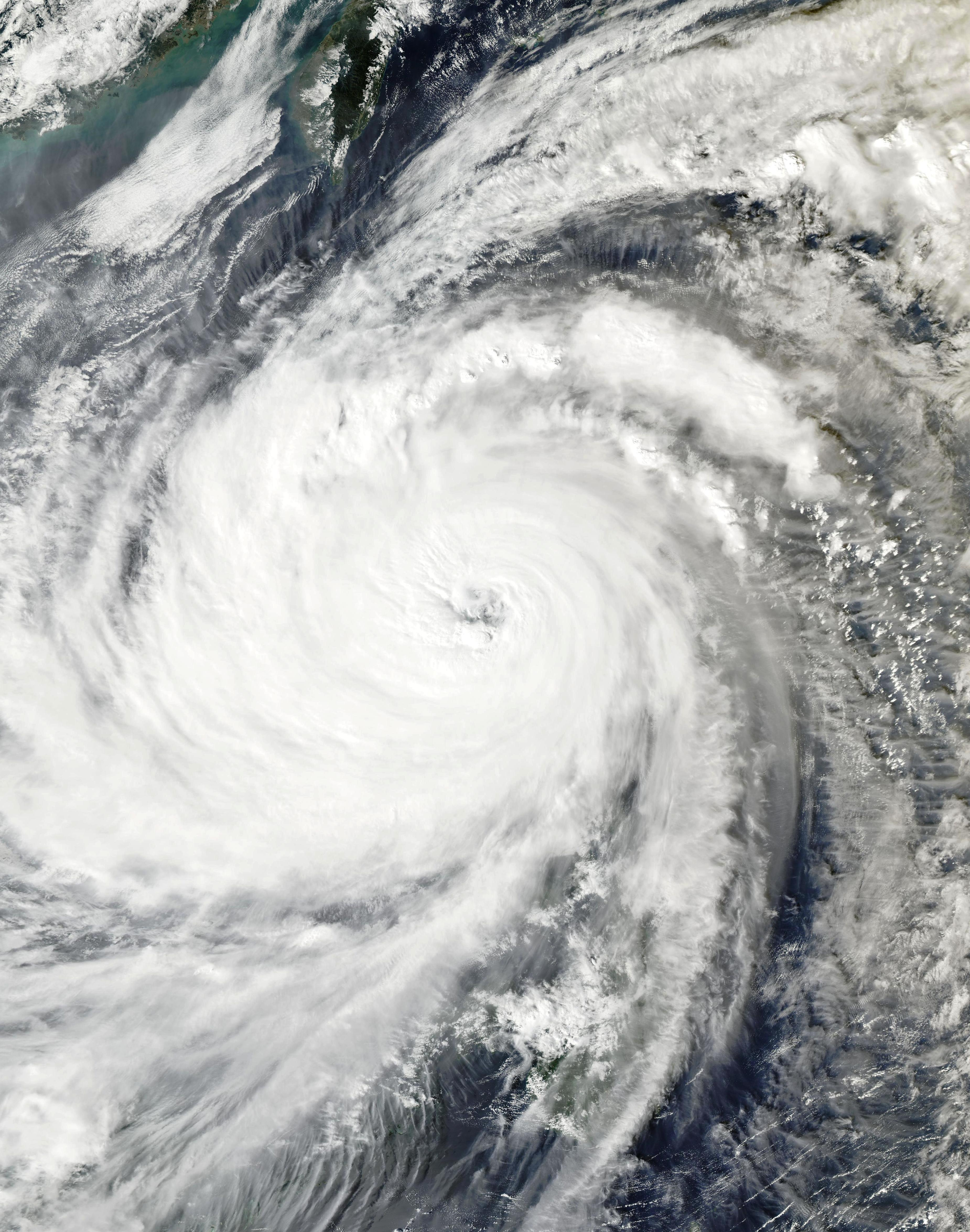
Typhoon Fung-wong (Uwan) nearing the Philippines as a Category 4 typhoon in November 2025

The Philippines is archipelagic country in Southeast Asia, located in the northwest Pacific Ocean. It consists of 7,641 islands. The country is known to be "the most exposed country in the world to tropical storms", with about twenty tropical cyclones entering the Philippine area of responsibility each year. In the Philippine languages, tropical cyclones are generally called bagyo.

Climatologically, in the Northwest Pacific basin, most tropical cyclones develop between May and October. However, the Philippines can experience a tropical cyclone anytime in the year, with the most storms during the months of June to September. This article includes any tropical cyclone of any intensity that affected the Philippines from 2000 onwards.

== 2000s ==
=== 2000 ===
- May 21, 2000: Tropical Depression Konsing/Drio passed by the Babuyan Group of Islands.
- July 5–7, 2000: Typhoon Kai-tak (Edeng) meandered over the western coast of Luzon while bringing torrential rainfall and landslides. 160 people were killed and 150 were missing in Luzon as a result.
- July 13, 2000: Tropical Depression Gloring passed over Central Luzon bringing heavy rainfall, but fortunately no damages or casualties were reported.
- July 22–23, 2000: Tropical Depression Huaning affected Northern Luzon with moderate to heavy rainfall.
- August 22, 2000: Typhoon Bilis (Isang) and its outer rain bands affected the extreme northern Luzon and Batanes with rainfall and gusty winds.
- September 5, 2000: Tropical Storm Bopha (Ningning) mainly affected the Cagayan Valley and Isabela province.
- October 27–29, 2000: Typhoon Xangsane (Reming) hit the Bicol Region, Southern Luzon and Metro Manila. In Tayabas, Quezon, rainfall of 312.3 mm was observed in 24 hours. The storm killed 40 people, lost 100,000 homes, and caused damage of $27.45 million.
- November 1–2, 2000: Tropical Storm Bebinca (Seniang) made the first direct hit over Metro Manila since 1992. The storm resulted in 26 deaths.
- November 30–December 1, 2000: Tropical Storm Rumbia (Toyang) made landfall over Eastern Samar and traversed much of Visayas. Flash floods were seen throughout most of the country, especially in Visayas and Mindanao. Landslides took place in the provinces of Bohol and Leyte. Overall, its effects killed 48 people.
- December 6–7, 2000: Tropical Depression Ulpiang flooded many regions in Visayas, causing landslides and killed 3 people.

=== 2001 ===
- February 18–19, 2001: Tropical Depression Auring brought rainfall throughout most of Visayas and Mindanao. Damages from crops and property had been estimated at ₱200 million (US$4.16 million).
- May 10–13, 2001: Tropical Storm Cimaron (Crising) brought heavy rainfall throughout most of the country due to its slow movement.
- June 21, 2001: Typhoon Chebi (Emong) affected Batanes and the Babuyan Group of Islands.
- July 4, 2001: Tropical Storm Utor (Feria) brought torrential rainfall over Northern Luzon, with Baguio experiencing a new 24-hour rainfall record. 163 people had died from the storm.
- July 10, 2001: Tropical Storm Trami (Gorio) affected the northern portion of Luzon bringing light rainfall.
- July 28–29, 2001: Typhoon Toraji (Isang) brought heavy rainfall to much of Luzon from its outflow.
- September 23–25, 2001: Typhoon Lekima (Labuyo) affected much of Northern Luzon and Batanes due to its slow movement, bringing heavy rainfall.
- November 7–8, 2001: Typhoon Lingling (Nanang) traversed much of Visayas bringing torrential rainfall, causing flash flooding and several landslides. As a result, 171 people had died.
- December 5–6, 2001: Tropical Storm Kajiki (Quedan) brought light to moderate rainfall over Visayas, killing two people and over 6,000 people displaced.

=== 2002 ===
- January 13–14, 2002: Tropical Storm Tapah (Agaton) neared the eastern coast of Luzon and made landfall over Isabela province.
- March 21–22, 2002: Tropical Depression Caloy moved over Mindanao, Central Visayas and Palawan. The storm damaged 2,703 homes, including 215 that were destroyed. Damage totaled about $2.4 million (₱124 million PHP). 35 people died from the storm.
- July 2–3, 2002: Typhoon Rammasun (Florita) enhanced the southwest monsoon, which caused several landslides, leading to more than 3,000 people having to evacuate.
- July 11–13, 2002: Similar to the previous storm, Tropical Storm Nakri (Hambalos) and Typhoon Halong (Inday) enhanced the monsoon which brought extreme rainfall over much of the Philippines.
- July 19–22, 2002: Tropical Depression Juan traversed Visayas and Luzon, dropping heavy rainfall.
- August 12–13, 2002: Tropical Depression Milenyo passed the Bicol Region, Southern Luzon and Manila, killing 35 people and causing $3.3 million in damage, with 13,178 houses damaged or destroyed.

=== 2003 ===
- April 20–23, 2003: Typhoon Kujira (Amang) mostly affected Batanes and the Babuyan Group of Islands with Tropical Cyclone Signal No. 2 being raised there.

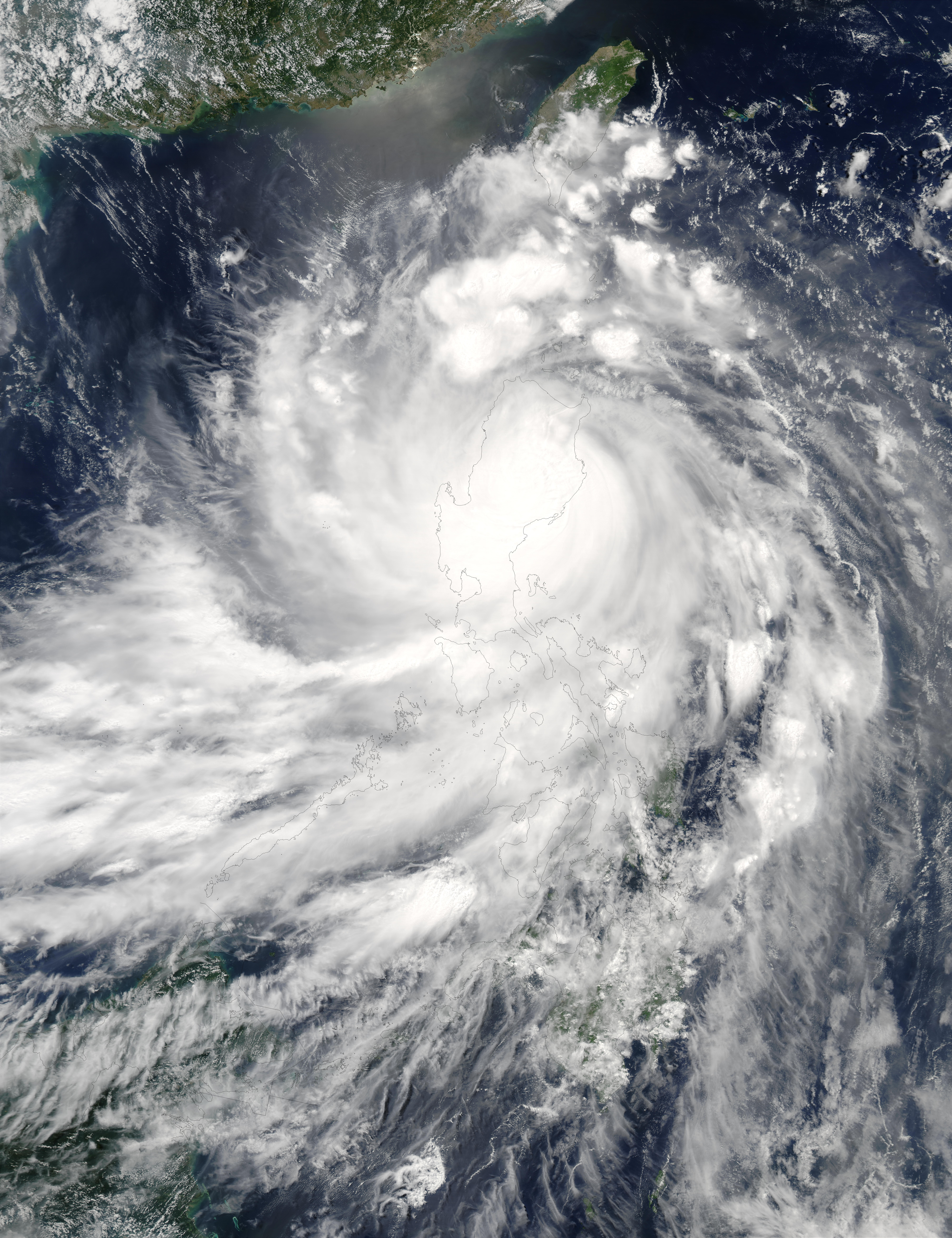
Typhoon Imbudo (Harurot) impacting northern Luzon on July 22, 2003

- May 26–28, 2003: Tropical Storm Linfa (Chedeng) and its slow moment caused severe flooding and torrential rainfall to most of Luzon. 41 people died in total from the storm.
- June 2, 2003: Tropical Storm Nangka (Dodong) passed the extreme Northern Luzon.
- June 15–17, 2003: Typhoon Soudelor (Egay) affected the eastern portion of the country bringing moderate rainfall.
- July 18–19, 2003: Tropical Storm Koni (Gilas) traversed Visayas bringing rainfall in the archipelago.
- July 21–22, 2003: Typhoon Imbudo (Harurot) battered Luzon with torrential rainfall and gusty winds. Power outages were experienced in Manila and the capacity of the Magat Dam reached its limit. 64 people died, mostly from the Cagayan Province.
- August 3, 2003: Tropical Storm Morakot (Juaning) closed Batanes bringing light rainfall. No deaths or damage were seen.
- August 22, 2003: Typhoon Krovanh (Niña) impacted northern Luzon with heavy rainfall. Rainfall in the country peaked at 342 mm (13.5 in) in Dagupan. Other high rainfall totals included 263 mm (10.4 in) in Baguio and 203 mm (8.0 in) in Iba, Zambales.
- September 1, 2003: Typhoon Dujuan (Onyok) passed by the extreme northern islands of Luzon. Along with the southwest monsoon, flash flooding in Metro Manila covered roads, causing traffic jams. Dangerous conditions caused many schools to close.
- October 21, 2003: Tropical Depression Ursula affected Palawan with light rainfall, killing one person.
- November 1–2, 2003: Tropical Storm Melor (Viring) affected much of Luzon and Eastern Visayas with moderate to heavy rainfall. The storm made landfall over Cagayan, eventually.
- November 13–14, 2003: Typhoon Nepartak (Weng) traversed Visayas, with rainfall around the area killing 13 people.
- December 27, 2003: Tropical Depression Zigzag made landfall over northeastern Mindanao, bringing light to heavy rainfall there.

=== 2004 ===
- May 17–18, 2004: Typhoon Nida (Dindo) neared the eastern coastline of the Philippines, bringing gusty winds over Eastern Samar, and torrential rainfall throughout most of Luzon and Visayas.

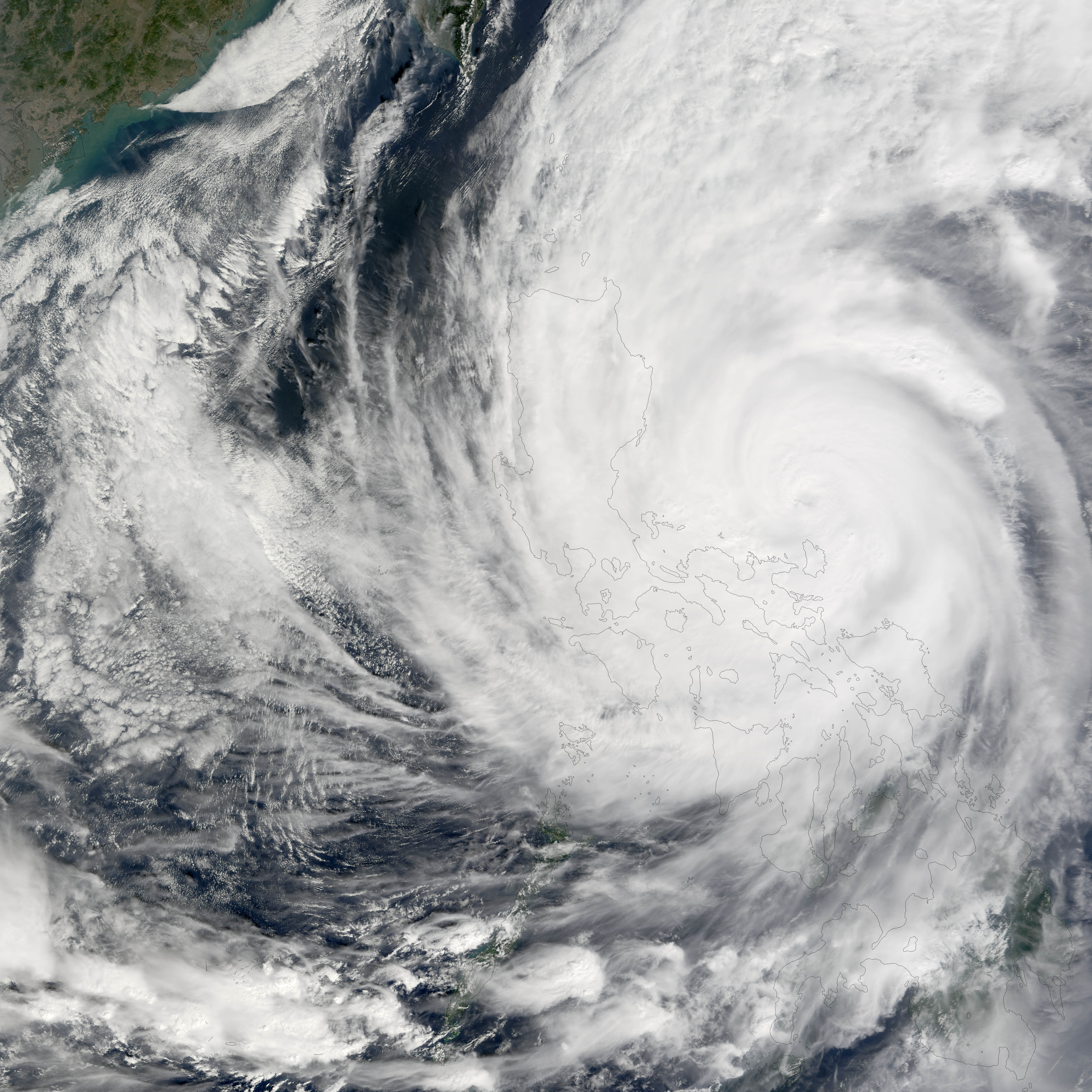
Typhoon Nanmadol (Yoyong) approaching the Philippines on December 2, 2004

- June 7–9, 2004: Typhoon Conson (Frank) affected most of Luzon, with Batanes and the Babuyan Group of Islands placed on Tropical Cyclone Signal No. 3 by PAGASA. Heavy rains killed 30 people in Manila.
- June 9–10, 2004: Tropical Storm Chanthu (Gener) crossed Visayas which also brought tremendous amount of rainfall.
- June 29–30, 2004: Typhoon Mindulle (Igme) battered the extreme northern portion of Luzon, which led to the deaths of 56 people.
- July 14, 2004: Tropical Storm Kompasu (Julian) traversed the Babuyan Group of Islands with light rainfall.
- September 15–16, 2004: Tropical Depression Pablo affected Mindanao, Central Visayas and Palawan by bringing light to moderate rainfall.
- November 18–20, 2004: Typhoon Muifa (Unding) made landfall over Naga City. Torrential rainfall led to severe flooding in many places, mostly in Southern Luzon and in the Bicol Region.
- November 22–23, 2004: Tropical Storm Merbok (Violeta) brought heavy rainfall over much of Luzon. 31 people had been killed by the storm.
- November 28–30, 2004: Tropical Depression Winnie worsened flooding over much of Luzon. Catastrophic damages occurred and the storm killed about 1,596 people.
- December 2, 2004: Typhoon Nanmadol (Yoyong) battered Luzon with strong winds and heavy rainfall. 70 people died from the typhoon.

=== 2005 ===
- March 17–18, 2005: Tropical Storm Roke (Auring) traversed Eastern Visayas and Central Visayas, bringing minor damages.
- May 17, 2005: Tropical Depression Crising meandered off the coast of Surigao del Sur in Mindanao.
- July 5, 2005: Tropical Depression Emong brought heavy rainfall over Metro Manila and Central Luzon.
- August 12, 2005: Tropical Storm Sanvu (Huaning) made landfall over the northern tip of Cagayan. Rainfall was only experienced over in the northern provinces.
- September 20–22, 2005: Tropical Storm Damrey (Labuyo) affected Northern Luzon, Batanes and the Bicol Region with rainfall, which led to severe flooding in many villages.
- November 10–11, 2005: Tropical Storm Tembin (Ondoy) impacted most of Luzon with heavy rainfall.
- November 19–20, 2005: Tropical Storm Bolaven (Pepeng) neared northern Philippines, bringing light to moderate rainfall until it made landfall over Cagayan and dissipated.

=== 2006 ===
- January 25–26, 2006: Tropical Depression Agaton crossed Visayas bringing moderate rainfall.
- May 10–12, 2006: Typhoon Chanchu (Caloy) moved through central Philippines. 100 homes were knocked off due to gusty winds in Albay, Bicol, while Metro Manila experienced power outages.

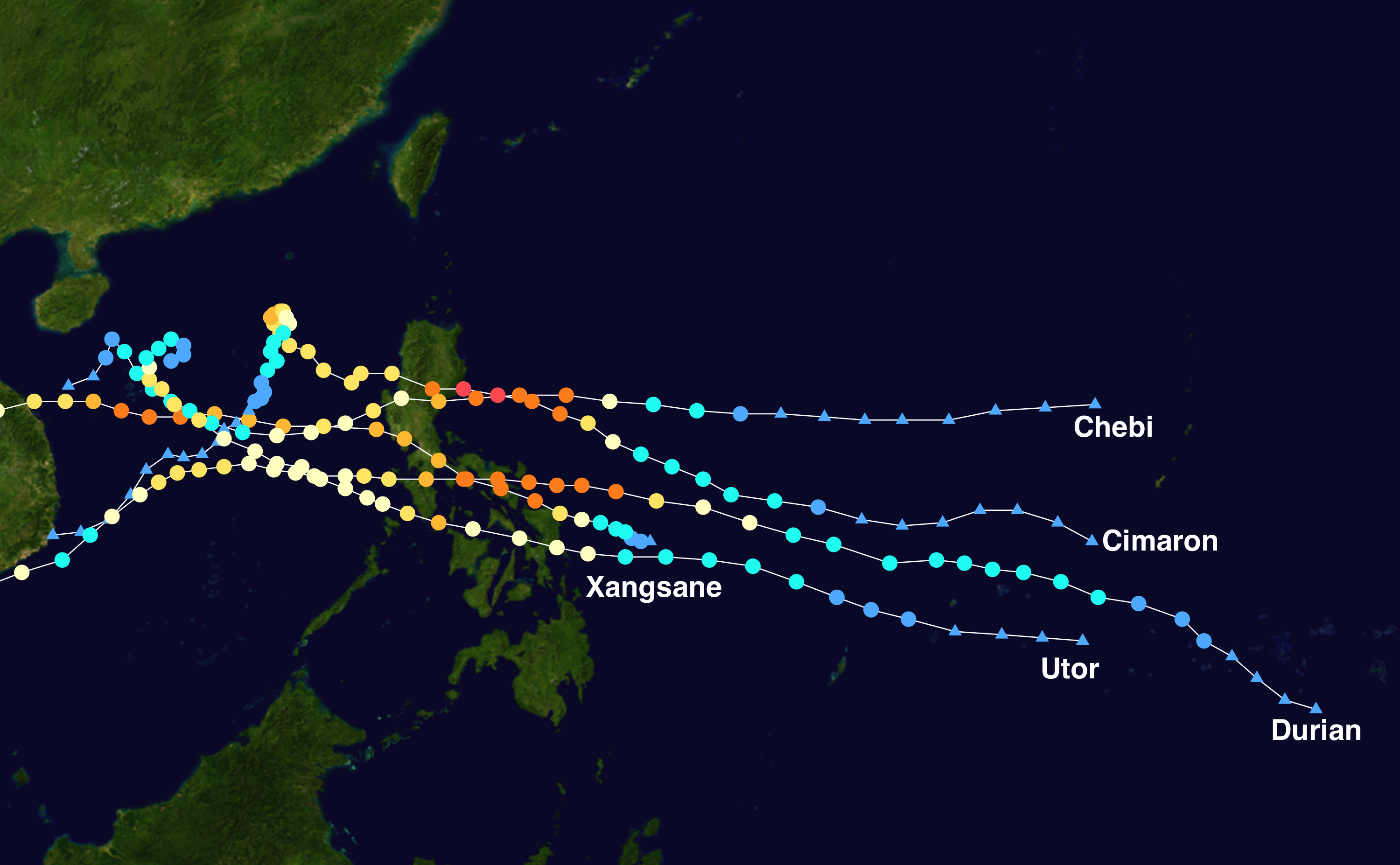
Tracks of typhoons that affected the Philippines during late 2006

- July 12–13, 2006: The outflow of Tropical Storm Bilis (Florita) brought torrential rainfall over Baguio and Manila. 14 people were killed.
- July 18, 2006: Similar to the precursor storm, the outflow of Typhoon Kaemi (Glenda) produced rainfall over Luzon.
- July 31, 2006: Tropical Storm Prapiroon (Henry) crossed Central Luzon, bringing moderate to heavy rainfall.
- August 6, 2006: The outer bands of Tropical Storm Bopha (Inday) produced heavy rains over northern Luzon, triggering flooding that destroyed 1,200 homes and killed seven people.
- September 27–28, 2006: Typhoon Xangsane (Milenyo) impacted the Bicol Region, Southern Luzon, Metro Manila and Central Luzon as a strong typhoon. Roughly 200 people died from the typhoon.
- October 29–30, 2006: Typhoon Cimaron battered Cagayan as a Category 5 super typhoon. At least 34 people died.
- November 10–11, 2006: Typhoon Chebi (Queenie) made landfall in Aurora Probince near Casiguran. Strong winds were experienced over Central Luzon and Ilocos Region.
- November 29–30, 2006: Typhoon Durian (Reming) badly impacted the Bicol Region as a Category 4 super typhoon. The typhoon caused massive loss of life when mudflows from the Mayon Volcano buried many villages.
- December 9–10, 2006: Typhoon Utor (Seniang) swept through much of Visayas. 38 people died from the typhoon.

=== 2007 ===
- August 7, 2007: Typhoon Pabuk (Chedeng) triggered monsoonal rains throughout most of the country. The streets of Manila were flooded by rains which left low-lying areas under neck-deep waters.
- August 8–9, 2007: Tropical Storm Wutip (Dodong) triggered numerous landslides and mudslides in Luzon due to the continued rainfall.
- August 15–17, 2007: Typhoon Sepat (Egay) and its outflow brought heavy rainfall over Metro Manila.
- September 16, 2007: The outer outflow of Typhoon Wipha (Goring) brought heavy rainfall over Negros Occidental.
- September 27–29, 2007: Tropical Depression Hanna brought torrential rainfall over Luzon, especially in the Ifugao Province.
- November 5, 2007: Typhoon Peipah (Kabayan) made landfall over Isabela Province and traversed Northern Luzon.
- November 19–28, 2007: Typhoon Hagibis (Lando) killed nine people in the Visayas and Mindanao archipelagos.
- November 23–26, 2007: Typhoon Mitag (Mina) brought torrential rainfall and several landslides over Bicol Region and Northern Luzon.

=== 2008 ===
- April 13–14, 2008: Tropical Storm Neoguri (Ambo) made landfall over Palawan. Heavy rain occurred in the island along with Leyte and Metro Manila.

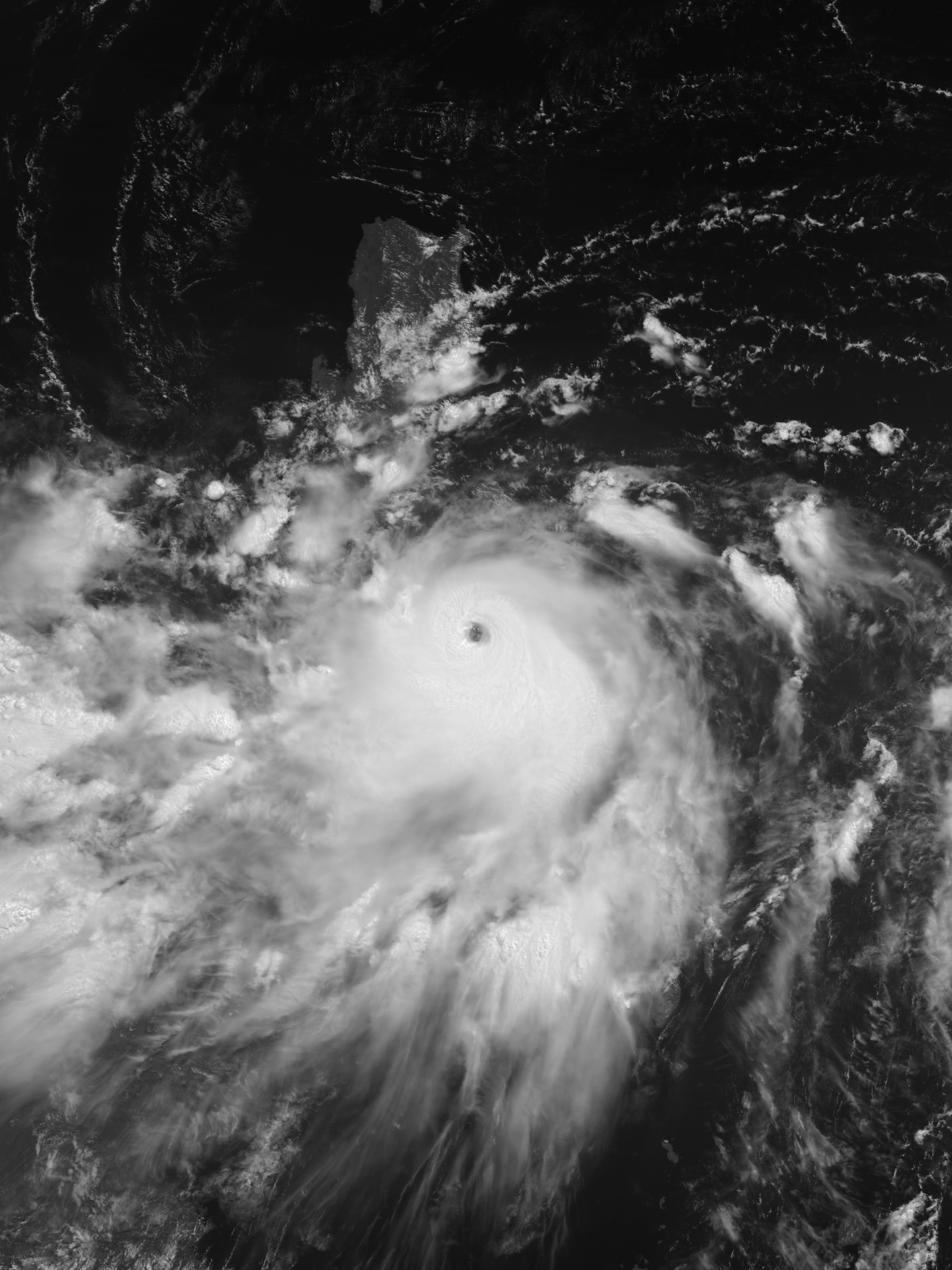
Typhoon Fengshen (Frank) impacting Visayas on June 21, 2008

- May 11, 2008: The outer rain bands of Typhoon Rammasun (Butchoy) brought heavy rains and mudslides over Visayas.
- May 17–18, 2008: Tropical Storm Halong (Cosme) impacted the Ilocos Region, bringing several power outages due to strong winds. Many areas were heavily flooded, which resulted in the deaths of 58 people.
- June 20–23, 2008: Typhoon Fengshen (Frank) traversed Central Visayas, Eastern Visayas and Southern Luzon. The typhoon was known for capsizing the ship MV Princess of the Stars, which killed 814 of the 922 people on board. 557 people were dead in the country excluding the deaths from the capsized ship.
- July 4, 2008: Tropical Depression Gener produced 13 mm (0.51 in) of rainfall over the Ilocos Region.
- July 16–17, 2008: Typhoon Kalmaegi (Helen) caused torrential rainfall over much of Luzon, with most impacts being over in the Ilocos Region and Cagayan.
- July 27–28, 2008: Typhoon Fung-wong (Igme) and its outer rain bands, along with the southwest monsoon brought heavy rainfall towards the northern part of the country, resulting in several class suspensions and the deaths of seven people.
- August 3–6, 2008: Tropical Depression Julian affected Batanes and the Babuyan Group of Islands with Tropical Cyclone Warning Signal No. 1 being raised there.
- August 20, 2008: Typhoon Nuri (Karen) made landfall over the extreme northern tip of Luzon as a Category 3 typhoon.
- August 27, 2008: Tropical Depression Lawin affected the eastern seaboards of Luzon bringing light rainfall.
- September 9–10, 2008: Typhoon Sinlaku (Marce) affected the northern and northeastern portion of Luzon.
- September 21, 2008: Typhoon Hagupit (Nina) passed just north of Luzon, resulting in 16 deaths due to gusty winds.
- September 30, 2008: Tropical Storm Higos (Pablo) traversed Eastern Samar, Bicol Region and Southern Luzon.
- November 6–8, 2008: Tropical Storm Maysak (Quinta) affected much of the country bringing moderate to heavy rainfall.
- November 8, 2008: Tropical Depression Rolly traversed Mindanao and Central Visayas. Rough seas caused a boat to be capsized which killed 11 people.
- November 12, 2008: The continuation of Maysak (Quinta), Tropical Depression Siony brought rainfall to the western portion of Luzon. 19 people were killed by Maysak.

=== 2009 ===
- January 3–5, 2009: Tropical Depression Auring caused heavy rain and severe flooding over Eastern Visayas and the eastern portion of Mindanao. The widespread damage led Siargao Island to be under a state of calamity.
- February 12–13, 2009: Tropical Depression Bising brought rainfall throughout much of the country, with the worst effects over Visayas.
- April 30–May 1, 2009: Tropical Depression Crising and its outer rain bands caused flooding over Southern Luzon with vast damages for crops.
- May 2–3, 2009: Tropical Storm Kujira (Dante) caused agricultural damage in most of the Bicol Region.
- May 7, 2009: Typhoon Chan-hom (Emong) made landfall over Pangasinan. Tropical Cyclone Warning Signal No. 3 was raised over much of the Ilocos Region and the western portion of Central Luzon, where gusty winds were recorded.
- June 23–24, 2009: Tropical Storm Nangka (Feria) moved through Visayas bringing moderate to heavy rainfall.
- July 9, 2009: Tropical Depression Gorio brushed the northern coast of Luzon, bringing rainfall and several landslides.
- July 16–17, 2009: Tropical Storm Molave (Isang) moved through the Babuyan Group of Islands.
- July 31, 2009: Tropical Depression Jolina affected much of Luzon.
- August 5–7, 2009: Typhoon Morakot (Kiko) enhanced the southwest monsoon bringing torrential rainfall and landslides, which led to class suspensions in many regions.

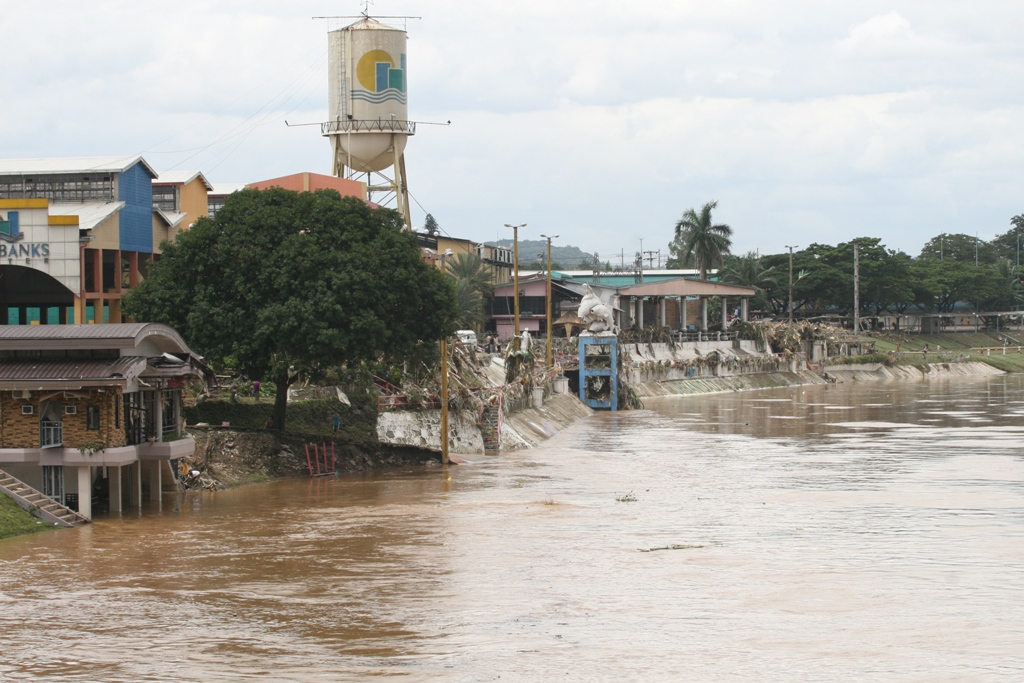
Severe flooding over Marikina due to Tropical Storm Ketsana (Ondoy)

- September 8, 2009: Tropical Depression Maring prompted PAGASA to raise a Tropical Cyclone Signal No. 1 over the Ilocos Region, whilst a 48-hour rainfall was recorded over in Metro Manila.
- September 12–13, 2009: Tropical Storm Koppu (Nando) brought 48-hour rainfall over Luzon and 24-hour rainfall in Visayas and Mindanao.
- September 25–26, 2009: Tropical Storm Ketsana (Ondoy) passed through Luzon, where torrential rainfall led to record flood levels to as high as 20 feet (6.1 m) in rural areas and in Metro Manila. 671 people had died from the storm with damages toppling up to ₱11 billion (US$237 million).
- October 3–8, 2009: Typhoon Parma (Pepeng) meandered over the regions in Northern Luzon. A total of 465 people had died from the typhoon.
- October 30, 2009: Typhoon Mirinae (Santi) brought gusty winds with PAGASA issuing a Tropical Cyclone Signal No. 3 over in Metro Manila, Southern Luzon, Mindoro and the Bicol Region.
- November 23, 2009: Tropical Depression Urduja brought rainfall over Mindanao, causing many delays in travel.

== 2010s ==
=== 2010 ===
- July 13, 2010: Typhoon Conson (Basyang) affected much of Luzon as a weak typhoon, killing 102 people. Due to poor forecasting by PAGASA at the time, President Benigno Aquino III reprimanded the weather agency for failing to predict that the storm would pass over Manila.
- July 17, 2010: Tropical Depression Caloy brought rainfall over Luzon which killed eight people.
- August 4–5, 2010: Tropical Storm Domeng produced heavy rain which caused several landslides over Northern Luzon. Large swells caused a boat to be capsized which killed three people.
- October 17–18, 2010: Typhoon Megi (Juan) made landfall over Northern Luzon as a Category 5 super typhoon. 31 people were killed by the typhoon.

=== 2011 ===
- May 8–9, 2011: Tropical Storm Aere (Bebeng) made landfall over Catanduanes and brought torrential rainfall over much of the country. 44 people died due to flooding.
- May 26, 2011: Typhoon Songda (Chedeng) neared the coastline of the eastern portion of the country where its outer rain bands caused flash flooding and landslides.
- June 22–24, 2011: A large outer rain band of Tropical Storm Meari (Falcon) brought tremendous rainfall across the country. Within two days, parts of Metro Manila were submerged in up to 1.5 m (4.9 ft) of water and multiple dams neared their critical or spill level.
- July 26–27, 2011: Tropical Storm Nock-ten (Juaning) brought torrential rainfall over much of the country, especially with Luzon where much of that archipelago was under Tropical Cyclone Signal No. 2. 75 people were killed by the storm.

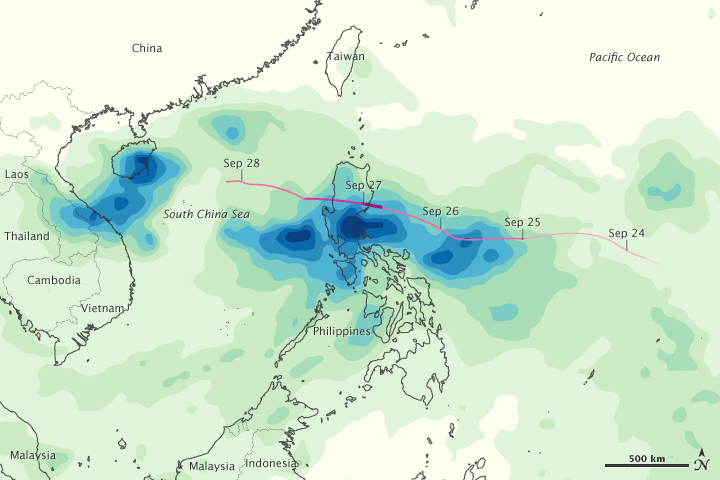
Amount of rainfall produced from Typhoon Nesat (Pedring)

- July 31 – August 2, 2011: Tropical Depression Lando, along with the outflow of Typhoon Muifa (Kabayan) brought torrential rainfall over much of Luzon and killed eight people.
- August 26–27, 2011: Typhoon Nanmadol (Mina) neared Northern Luzon with its peak intensity as a Category 5 super typhoon. The typhoon brought damaging winds which killed 35 people and caused infrastructural losses of Php40.9 billion (US$907.9 million), making it one of the costliest typhoons in the Philippines.
- September 26–27, 2011: Typhoon Nesat (Pedring) brought flash flooding over Central Luzon and Metro Manila. Thousands of residents were out of power and a state of calamity was declared in the aftermath of the typhoon due to the flooding. 85 people were killed while 18 people remained missing.
- September 30 – October 1, 2011: Typhoon Nalgae (Quiel) mainly affected Northern Luzon, which made landfall as a Category 4 super typhoon over the Isabela Province. Residents in the archipelago were still recovering from the previous Typhoon Nesat when the typhoon hit. 18 people were killed.
- October 11, 2011: Tropical Storm Banyan (Ramon) passed through the southern portion of Visayas and Northern Mindanao, bringing light rainfall. About 75,000 people were affected by the storm.
- December 16–17, 2011: Tropical Storm Washi (Sendong) passed through the archipelago of Mindanao, killing 2,546 people in total, making it one of the deadliest storms to affect the Philippines.

=== 2012 ===
- June 1–2, 2012: Tropical Storm Mawar (Ambo) brought torrential rainfall over the Bicol Region, triggering delays in air flights.
- June 16–17, 2012: The outer rain bands of Typhoon Guchol (Butchoy) brought rainfall across much of the country. One person drowned in Rizal Province.
- July 19–20, 2012: Tropical Depression Ferdie caused widespread rainfall and gusty winds in Luzon and Visayas.
- July 28–31, 2012: Typhoon Saola (Gener) and its outer rain bands helped enhance the southwest monsoon which brought torrential rainfall and widespread flooding over much of the country. 54 people died while damage from the storm amounted to ₱728 million (US$17.3 million), more than half of them was due to agricultural losses.
- August 15, 2012: Tropical Storm Kai-tak (Helen) brushed the northern coastline of Northern Luzon as a weak tropical storm, bringing flash flooding and several landslides.
- August 23–27, 2012: Typhoon Tembin (Igme) mostly affected the islands of extreme Northern Luzon. Flash flooding was also reported in Luzon which killed 8 people.
- September 25–26, 2012: Typhoon Jelawat (Lawin) brought large swells and light rainfall over the eastern seaboards of the country.
- October 3, 2012: Tropical Storm Gaemi (Marce) and its outer bands dropped heavy rainfall over Luzon, prompting class suspensions.
- October 23–24, 2012: Tropical Storm Son-Tinh (Ofel) passed by the central part of the country, with Tropical Cyclone Signal No. 2 being raised in much of Visayas.
- December 3–4, 2012: Typhoon Bopha (Pablo) became the strongest tropical cyclone on record to affect Mindanao. Extensive and widespread damage was reported in that archipelago and left a total of 1,901 people dead.
- December 26, 2012: Tropical Storm Wukong (Quinta) passed through Visayas bringing light rainfall.

=== 2013 ===
- January 2–3, 2013: Tropical Depression Auring passed Mindanao and Palawan, bringing light rainfall.
- January 10–12, 2013: Tropical Depression Bising stayed off the eastern coast while bringing moderate to heavy rainfall over Eastern Visayas, Bicol Region and Mindanao.
- February 19–20, 2013: Tropical Depression Shanshan (Crising) affected the southern portion of the country bringing heavy rainfall and flooding.
- June 8–10, 2013: Tropical Storm Yagi (Dante) and its southwestern outflow brought heavy rainfall to the country, prompting the PAGASA to declare the 2013 Philippine rainy season on June 10.
- June 16–18, 2013: Tropical Storm Leepi (Emong) worsened the flooding in the country from the precursor storm.

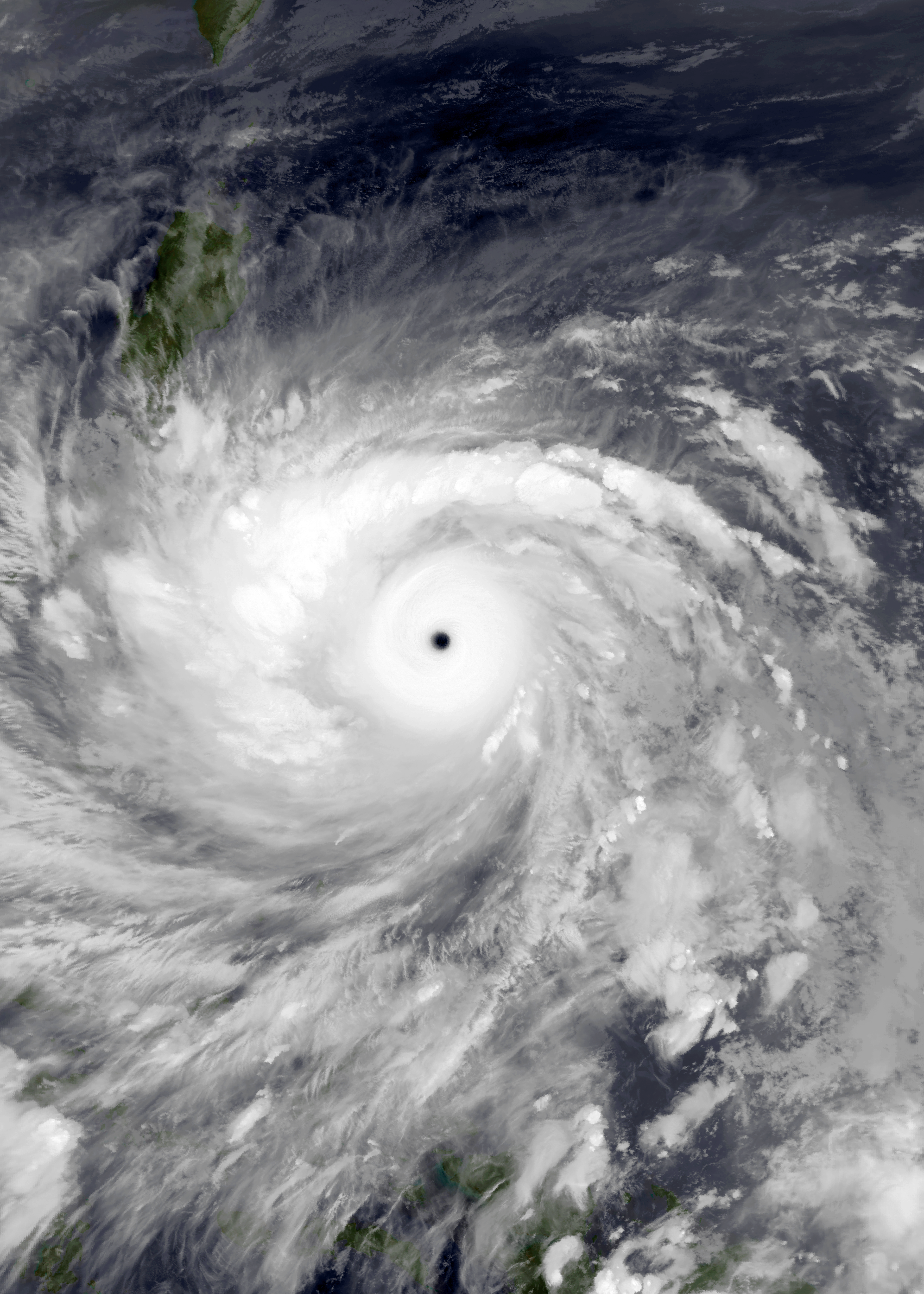
Typhoon Haiyan (Yolanda) at its peak strength in November 2013

- June 19, 2013: Tropical Depression Fabian briefly affected the western coast of the country with moderate rainfall.
- June 28–29, 2013: Tropical Storm Rumbia (Gorio) impacted Southern Luzon and Eastern Visayas.
- July 17, 2013: Tropical Storm Cimaron (Isang) brushed the northeastern tip of Luzon. A lightning incident killed two people in Ilocos Sur.
- August 11–12, 2013: Typhoon Utor (Labuyo) battered Luzon as a strong typhoon. Damage losses from the typhoon amounted to ₱1.58 billion (US$36.4 million), the majority resulting from agricultural damage.
- August 16–19, 2013: Tropical Storm Trami (Maring) enhanced the southwestern monsoon which brought torrential rainfall and extreme flooding over Metro Manila, and much of the northern part of the country.
- September 20, 2013: Typhoon Usagi (Odette) brushed Batanes as a Category 4 super typhoon.
- October 10–11, 2013: Typhoon Nari (Santi) struck and battered Luzon as a Category 3 typhoon. Gusty winds caused damages of up to Php3.3 billion (US$77 million).
- October 31, 2013: Typhoon Krosa (Vinta) made landfall over the northwestern tip of Cagayan.
- November 4, 2013: Tropical Depression Wilma affected southern Philippines.
- November 8, 2013: Typhoon Haiyan (Yolanda) brushed Visayas as an intense typhoon, killing 6,352 people. It was also the costliest typhoon in the Philippines.
- November 11, 2013: Tropical Depression Zoraida affected Palawan and Mindanao.

=== 2014 ===
Typhoon Rammasun making landfall in Rapu-rapu, Albay in the Philippines on July 15

- January 15–17, 2014: Tropical Storm Lingling (Agaton) produced heavy rainfall over Mindanao, with damages toppling to Php567 million (US$12.6 million).
- January 31, 2014: Tropical Storm Kajiki (Basyang) brought a few landslides over Cebu and Southern Leyte.
- March 21–22, 2014: Tropical Depression Caloy affected Eastern Visayas and Northern Mindanao.
- June 10, 2014: Tropical Storm Mitag (Ester) and its outflow helped bring in rainfall to much of the country, also prompting the PAGASA to declare the 2014 wet season to June 10.
- July 15–16, 2014: Typhoon Rammasun (Glenda) impacted the Bicol Region as a Category 4 typhoon. In total, Rammasun killed 106 people and caused a damage up to Php38.6 billion (US$885 million).
- September 15, 2014: Typhoon Kalmaegi (Luis) battered Northern Luzon.
- September 19–20, 2014: Tropical Storm Fung-wong (Mario) brought severe rainfall and flash flooding over Southern Luzon, especially in Metro Manila.
- November 27, 2014: Tropical Depression Queenie passed through southern Visayas and Northern Mindanao.
- December 6–8, 2014: Typhoon Hagupit (Ruby) impacted much of the Visayas archipelago and Bicol Region.
- December 28–30, 2014: Tropical Storm Jangmi (Seniang) affected much of Mindanao bringing heavy rainfall.

=== 2015 ===
- January 17–18, 2015: Tropical Storm Mekkhala (Amang) affected Eastern Visayas and the Bicol Region. Notably, the storm disturbed Pope Francis’ visit to the country after the victims of Typhoon Haiyan on November 8, 2013. Although the storm also caused an airplane crash in Tacloban, nobody was hurt in the incident.

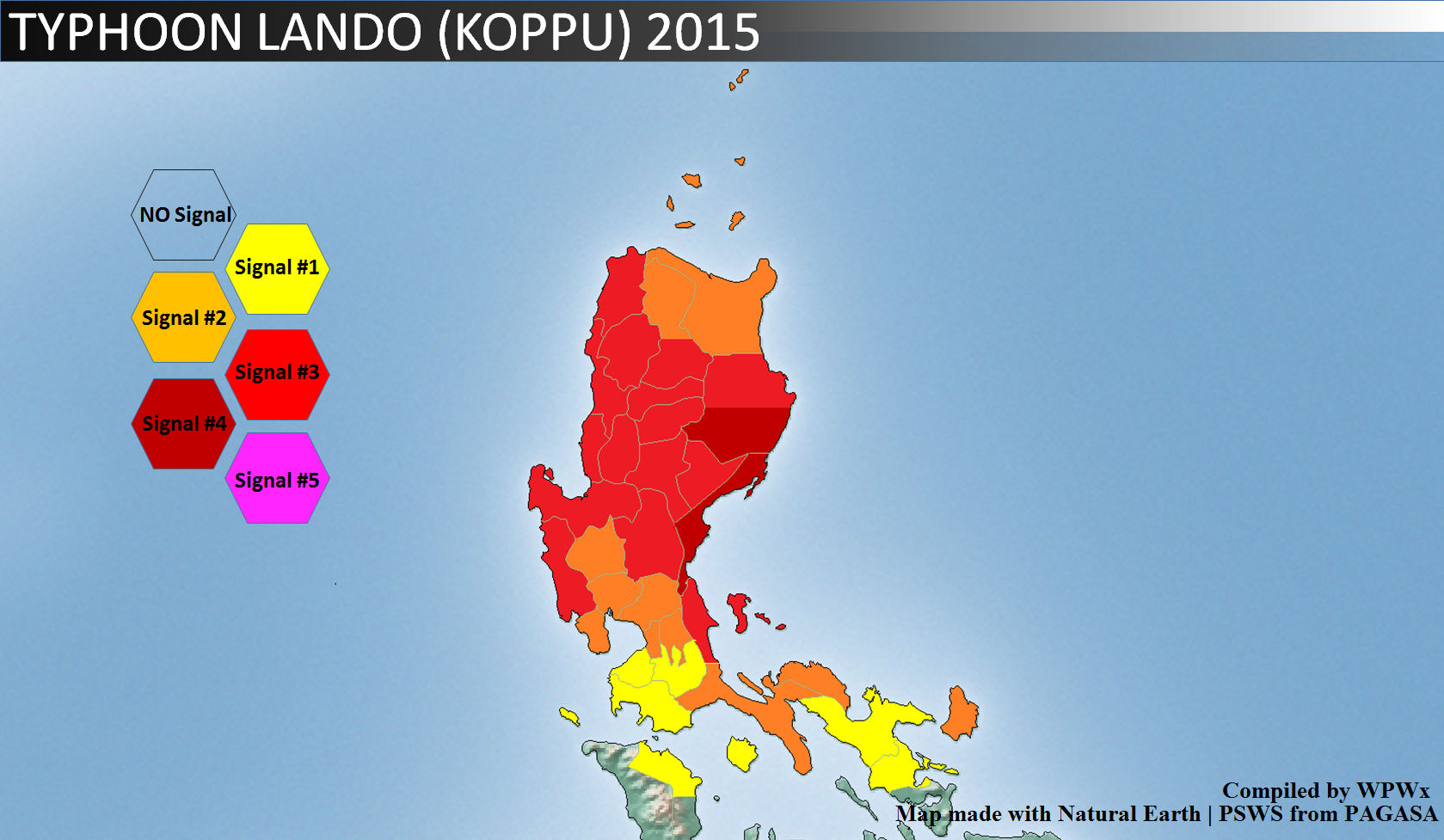
Highest Tropical Cyclone Warning Signal raised by PAGASA across the Philippines in relation to Typhoon Koppu (Lando)

- April 5, 2015: A weakening Tropical Storm Maysak (Chedeng) hit Cagayan Valley, killing 5 people.
- May 8–10, 2015: Typhoon Noul (Dodong) hit the northwestern tip of Luzon as a Category 5 super typhoon.
- July 4–6, 2015: Tropical Storm Linfa (Egay) affected Northern Luzon. 198 houses were damaged and power outages were experienced within the affected area.
- August 19–21, 2015: Typhoon Goni (Ineng) battered the northern portion of Luzon as a strong typhoon.
- September 30 – October 1, 2015: Tropical Storm Mujigae (Kabayan) brought light rainfall over much of Luzon.
- October 17–19, 2015: Typhoon Koppu (Lando) impacted Northern Luzon as a Category 4 super typhoon, killing 62 people in total.
- December 14–15, 2015: Typhoon Melor (Nona) passed through northern Visayas and Southern Luzon as a strong typhoon.
- December 18, 2015: Tropical Depression Onyok made landfall over Davao Oriental, bringing minor damages.

=== 2016 ===
- June 26, 2016: Tropical Depression Ambo brought some rainfall over Luzon.
- July 31, 2016: Tropical Storm Nida (Carina) made landfall over Cagayan. Landslides made major roads in the regions impassable.
- September 13, 2016: Typhoon Meranti (Ferdie) struck the province of Batanes as a Category 5 super typhoon and passed by Itbayat. A state of calamity was declared in the province a few days later.
- October 14–15, 2016: Typhoon Sarika (Karen) impacted Central Luzon as a Category 4 typhoon.
- October 19, 2016: Typhoon Haima (Lawin) impacted Northern Luzon from a Category 5 super typhoon. Signal No. 5 was raised in the passage of the typhoon.
- November 24–25, 2016: Tropical Storm Tokage (2016) passed by Visayas, bringing heavy rainfall and flooding.
- December 25, 2016: Typhoon Nock-ten (Nina) impacted the Bicol Region and Southern Luzon.

=== 2017 ===
- January 8–10, 2017: Tropical Depression Auring made landfall over Northern Mindanao. Flooding from Auring killed a total of 11 people. and damages were totalled at ₱7.14 million (US$144,000) from agriculture and fishing in Negros Occidental.
- April 15, 2017: Tropical Depression Crising passed Visayas bringing some rainfall. Ten people were killed by the storm in Cebu.

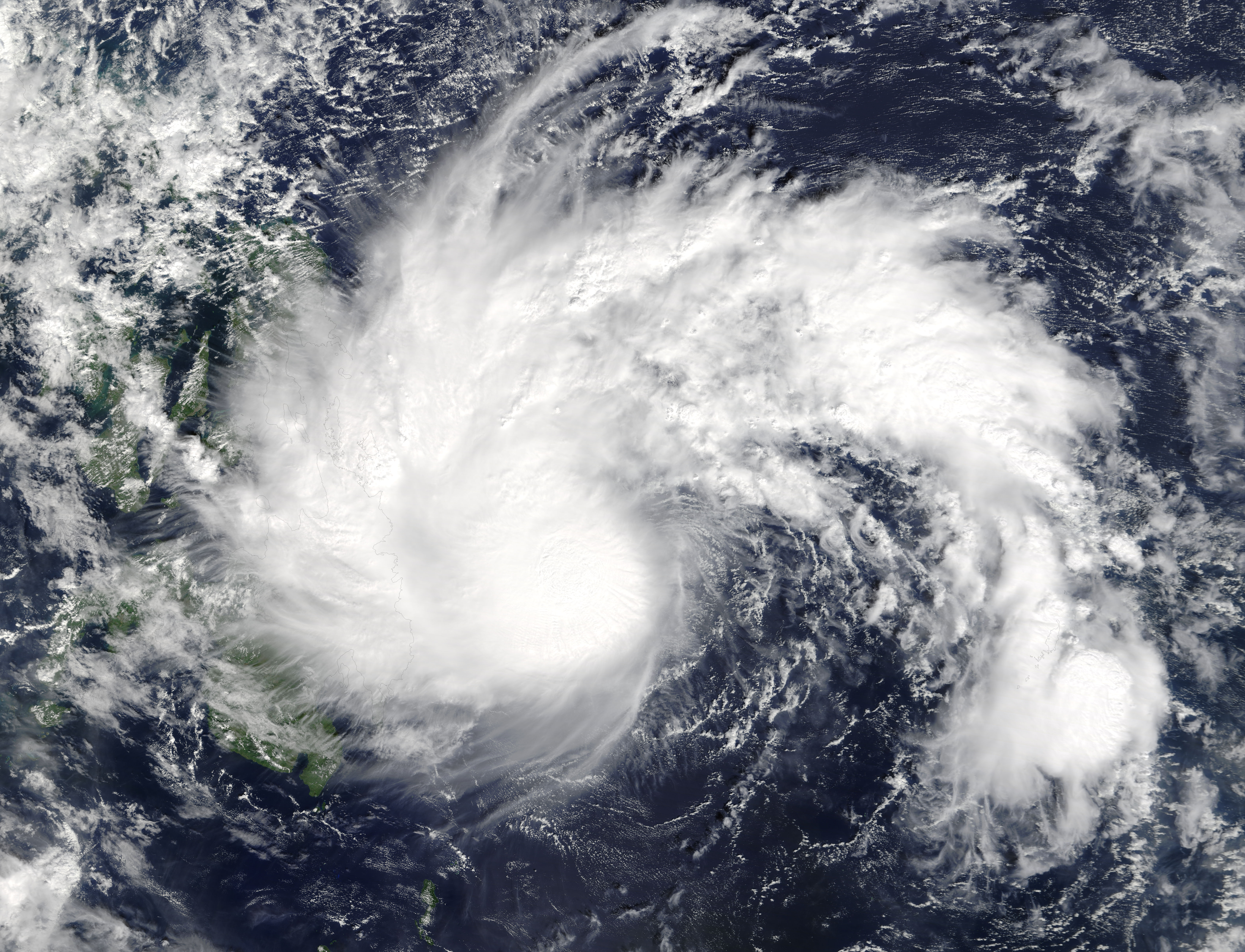
Tropical Storm Tembin (Vinta) approaching the Philippines on December 21, 2017

- July 28–29, 2017: Typhoon Nesat (Gorio) enhanced the southwestern monsoon which brought widespread rainfall and flooding throughout much of the country. Damages reportedly reached ₱247.58 million (US$4.9 million).
- August 25, 2017: Tropical Storm Pakhar (Jolina) affected Northern Luzon. The Cordillera Administrative Region experienced power outages and several landslides.
- September 11–12, 2017: Tropical Storm Doksuri (Maring) passed Central Luzon and Metro Manila. The storm left 22 people dead and four missing.
- October 12, 2017: Tropical Storm Khanun (Odette) developed to the coast of Ilocos Region, killing one person.
- October 31, 2017: Tropical Storm Damrey (Ramil) brought torrential rainfall over Western Visayas.
- November 9–10, 2017: Tropical Storm Haikui (Salome) traversed Southern Luzon and Bicol Region with landslides being reported over the provinces.
- December 15–17, 2017: Tropical Storm Kai-tak (Urduja) made a few landslides over Visayas, bringing torrential rainfall and flash flooding, killing 83 people.
- December 21–22, 2017: Typhoon Tembin (Vinta) passed over Mindanao and Palawan. 266 people died from the storm.

=== 2018 ===
Mangkhut making landfall over Baggao, Cagayan in Luzon on September 14

- January 1–2, 2018: Tropical Storm Bolaven (Agaton) impacted southern Philippines and the island of Palawan. Rainfall caused several travel delays in many provinces. Total damage was recorded at ₱554.7 million (US$11.1 million), mostly coming from crop damage.
- February 13, 2018: Tropical Storm Sanba (Basyang) affected Mindanao with heavy rainfall. A state of calamity was declared in two municipalities in Surigao del Sur.
- June 8, 2018: Tropical Storm Maliksi (Domeng) brought rainfall which prompted the PAGASA to declare the official start of the rainy season on June 8. Two people were killed by heavy monsoonal rains, enhanced by Maliksi, in the Philippines.
- June 13, 2018: Tropical Storm Gaemi (Ester) briefly impacted the extreme northern islands of the country. Three people died by monsoonal rains.
- July 21, 2018: Tropical Depression Josie brought torrential rainfall and ocean-high flooding throughout most of the country, especially Metro Manila. Damages toppled up to ₱4.66 billion (US$87.4 million).
- September 10, 2018: Tropical Storm Barijat (Neneng) caused some landslides over Batanes.
- September 14–15, 2018: Typhoon Mangkhut (Ompong) battered most of Luzon. Tropical Cyclone Signal No. 4 was raised over the northern provinces. 127 people died due to gusty winds and rainfall that caused landslides.
- October 29–30, 2018: A weakening Typhoon Yutu (Rosita) made landfall over Northern Luzon as a strong typhoon. Landslides and flooding killed 27 people.
- November 20, 2018: Tropical Depression Samuel passed through Visayas.
- December 29, 2018: Tropical Depression Usman affected Mindanao and Eastern Visayas with torrential rainfall and heavy flooding. The weak system killed 156 people dead, with 26 people missing.

=== 2019 ===
- January 20–21, 2019: Tropical Depression Amang made landfall over Siargao province. The storm brought landslides over Davao Oriental and Agusan del Norte.
- March 19, 2019: Tropical Depression Chedeng made landfall over Davao Occidental. Some minor infrastructural damage was reported.
- July 17, 2019: Tropical Storm Danas (Falcon) affected the top half of the country with rainfall.

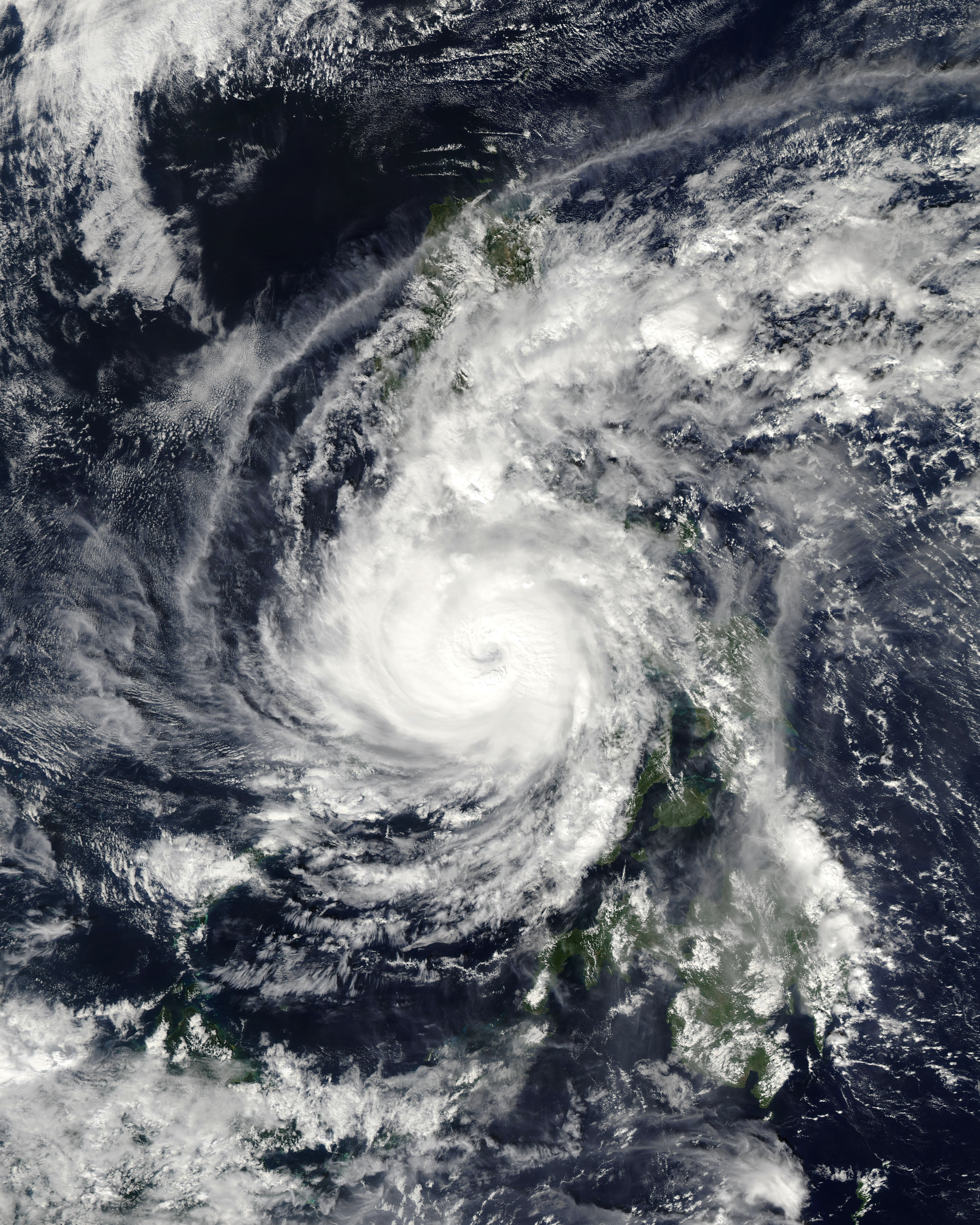
Typhoon Phanfone (Ursula) over Visayas in December 2019

- August 5–7, 2019: Typhoon Lekima (Hanna), despite it did not made landfall, passed close to Batanes with Tropical Cyclone Signal No. 1 being raised there. Rainfall and flooding caused several class suspensions. Agricultural damages were recorded over Central Luzon.
- August 24, 2019: Tropical Storm Bailu (Ineng) dropped rainfall over Northern Luzon. Flooding in Ilocos Norte prompted local officials to declare a state of calamity.
- August 27, 2019: Tropical Depression Jenny passed over Central Luzon, leaving two people dead and moderate damages.
- September 3–4, 2019: Typhoon Lingling (Liwayway) enhanced the southwest monsoon which brought heavy rainfall throughout most of the country.
- September 30, 2019: Typhoon Mitag (Onyok) neared the country without making landfall, but produced moderate to heavy shows over Cagayan and Batanes.
- November 8, 2019: Tropical Storm Nakri (Quiel), combined with the effects of a cold front, produced widespread rainfall. Cagayan Province alone suffered ₱1.8 billion (US$35.6 million) in damage.
- November 19–20, 2019: Typhoon Kalmaegi (Ramon) hit Cagayan and moved southwestward over the Luzon archipelago.
- December 2–3, 2019: Typhoon Kammuri (Tisoy) passed through Visayas and the Bicol Region as a Category 4 typhoon. Heavy winds and flooding were reported throughout most of the country.
- December 24–25, 2019: Typhoon Phanfone (Ursula) passed through the Visayas archipelago as a Category 3 typhoon. The total fatalities of the said typhoon were 50 deaths (with 55 people missing, and over 300 injured) and the damages were at $67.2 million or roughly ₱3.44 billion.

== 2020s ==
=== 2020 ===
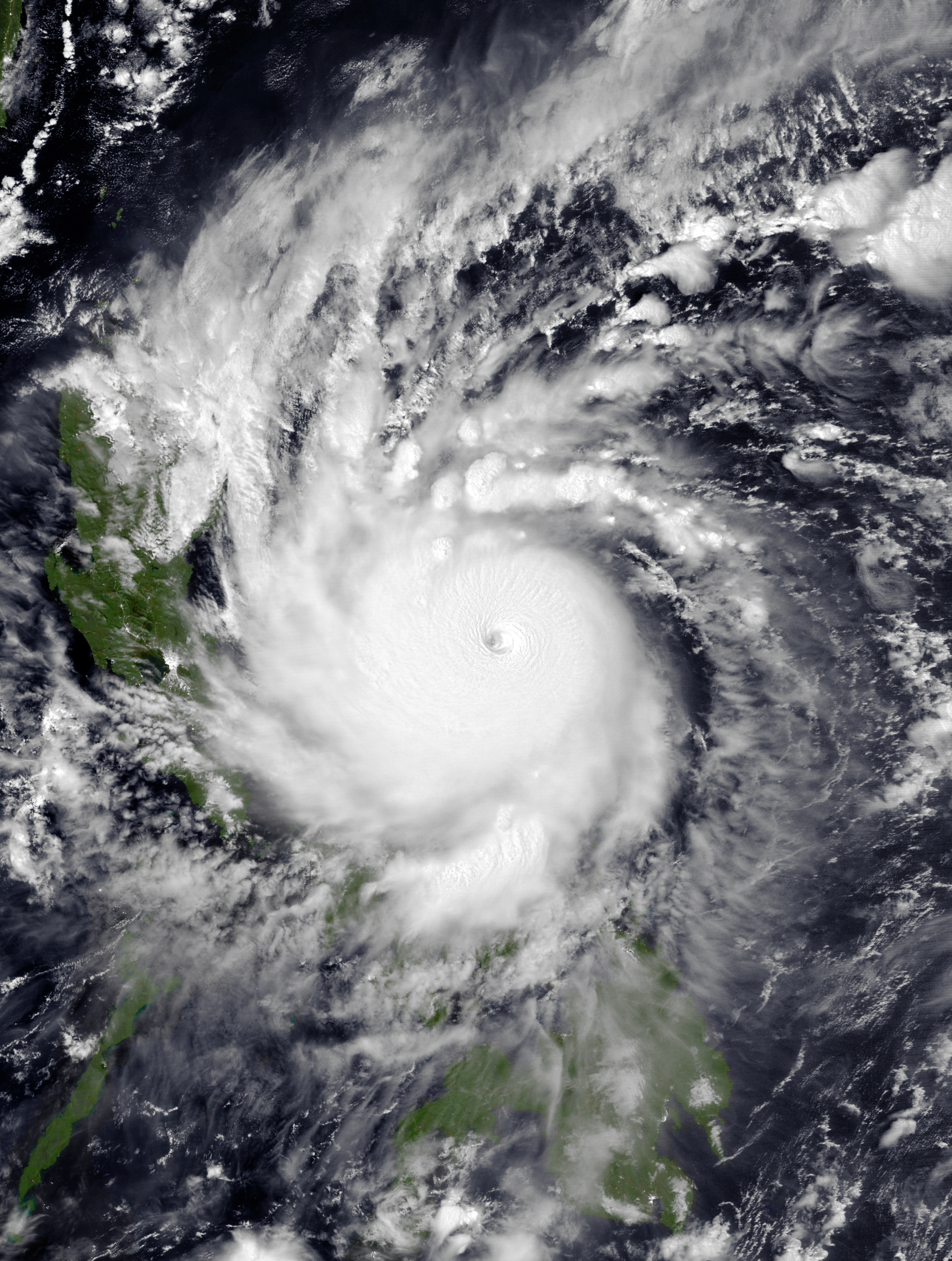
Typhoon Goni (Rolly) at peak intensity near Catanduanes on November 1, 2020

- May 14–17, 2020: Typhoon Vongfong (Ambo) made landfall over Eastern Samar as a Category 3 typhoon, and affected much of Luzon. Preparations for the typhoon were complicated due to the ongoing COVID-19 pandemic. Throughout the Philippines, Vongfong caused around ₱1.57 billion (US$31.1 million) in damage, and killed five people.
- June 11–12, 2020: Tropical Depression Butchoy prompted the PAGASA to issue Tropical Cyclone Signal No. 1 over the western portion of the country as it brought heavy rainfall. The storm's rainfall also prompted PAGASA to declare the start of the 2020 Philippine rainy season on June 12.
- July 13–14, 2020: Tropical Depression Carina brought heavy rainfall which led to Tropical Cyclone Signal No. 1 being raised over the Babuyan Islands and Batanes.
- August 10, 2020: Tropical Storm Mekkhala (Ferdie) brought monsoonal conditions over much of Luzon.
- October 13–14, 2020: Tropical Depression Ofel passed through Southern Luzon and the northern portion of Visayas. Floods and rainfall brought damages of up to ₱9.1 million (US$187,000).
- October 20, 2020: Tropical Storm Saudel (Pepito) affected much of Luzon, which made landfall over Casiguran, Aurora. There were no deaths reported but damages were up to ₱105.8 million (US$2.18 million).
- October 25–26, 2020: Typhoon Molave (Quinta) made three landfalls, affecting the Bicol Region, Southern Luzon and the island of Mindoro. The typhoon left 27 people dead and damages of ₱4.22 billion (US$87.1 million).
- October 31 – November 1, 2020: Typhoon Goni (Rolly) made landfall over Catanduanes as a Category 5 super typhoon; the strongest landfalling tropical cyclone on record by 1-minute sustained winds. Damages were up to ₱20 billion (US$369 million), making it the ninth costliest typhoon in the country.
- November 5–6, 2020: Tropical Storm Atsani (Siony) affected Batanes and the Babuyan Islands.
- November 11, 2020: Typhoon Vamco (Ulysses) caused the worst flooding in Metro Manila since 2009. 98 people were killed and damages of ₱20.3 billion (US$421 million), the seventh costliest Philippine typhoon on record.
- December 18–19, 2020: Tropical Depression Vicky caused flooding and several landslides over southern Philippines. Nine people were killed.

=== 2021 ===
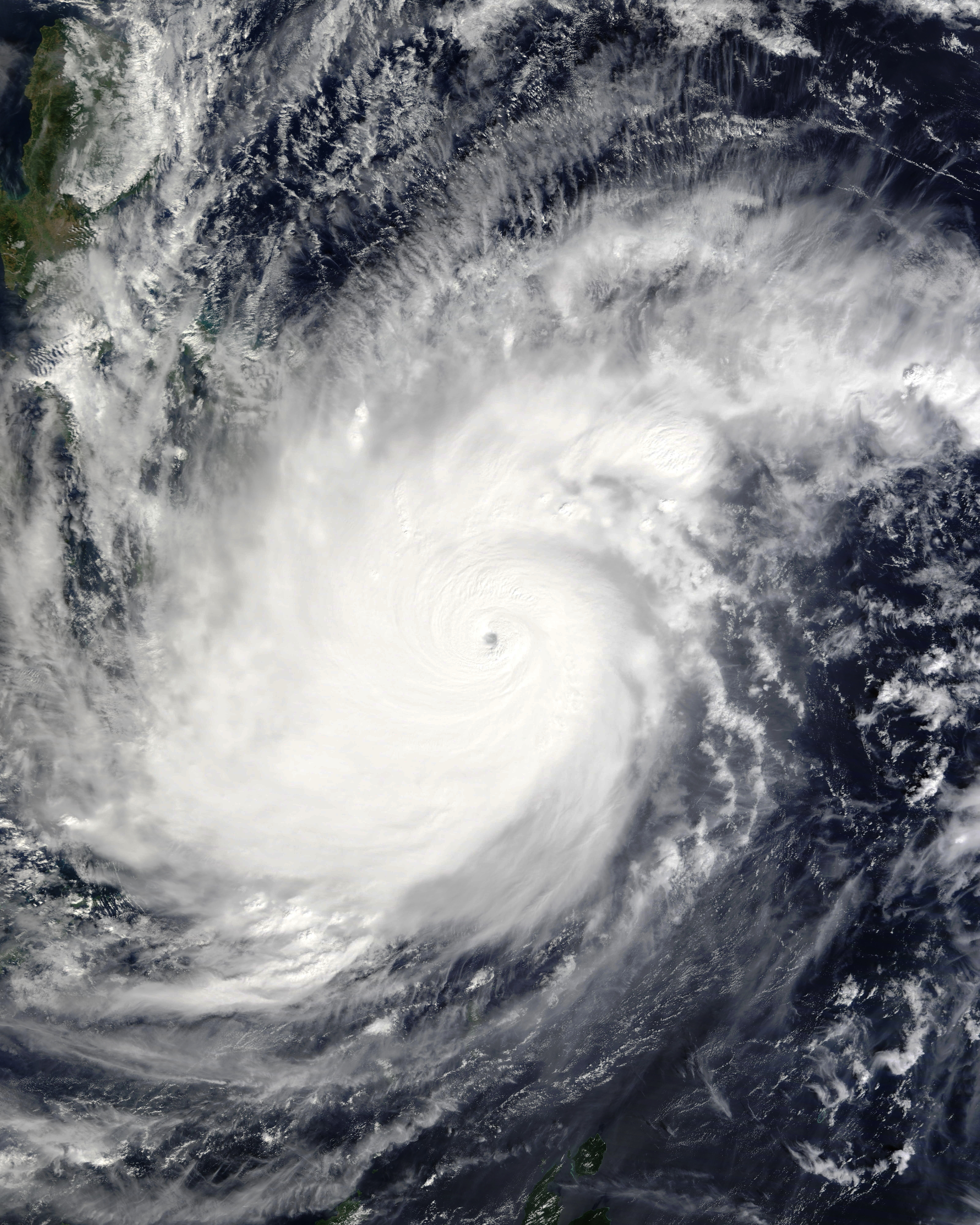
Typhoon Rai (Odette) at its peak intensity while approaching the Philippines on December 16, 2021

- January 19–20, 2021: an unnamed tropical depression affected much of Visayas and Northern Mindanao. Heavy rainfall from the system resulted in one death and agricultural damages of up to ₱642.5 million (US$13.2 million).
- February 20–22, 2021: Tropical Storm Dujuan (Auring) affected Eastern Visayas and the Caraga region with heavy rainfall and flooding.
- April 17–19, 2021: Typhoon Surigae (Bising) brushed the eastern part of the Philippines, killing 10 people.
- May 13, 2021: Tropical Storm Crising made landfall over Mindanao as a weak system, bringing damages estimated at ₱23.2 million (US$486,000).
- June 1–2, 2021: Tropical Storm Choi-wan (Dante) traversed much of Visayas and northern Mindanao, bringing torrential rainfall and flooding.
- September 6–8, 2021: Tropical Storm Conson (Jolina) moved over much of Visayas and Southern Luzon. The storm caused extensive flooding which caused damages of about ₱1.59 billion (US$31.8 million).
- September 10–11, 2021: Typhoon Chanthu (Kiko) brushed the northeastern coastline of Luzon bringing gusty winds, while moving directly through Batanes and causing ₱1.49 billion in damage (US$30 million).
- September 28–30, 2021: Typhoon Mindulle (2021) hit The Philippines.
- October 10–11, 2021: Tropical Storm Kompasu (Maring) brought widespread flooding over much of the country, with severe impacts over the Luzon archipelago. The storm killed 43 people and caused damages estimated at ₱6.4 billion (US$127 million).
- December 16–17, 2021: Typhoon Rai (Odette) struck the Caraga Region and causes catastrophic damage before continuing across southern Visayas and moving through Palawan. The typhoon killed 410 people and left more than ₱51.8 billion (US$1.02 billion) in damage.

=== 2022 ===
Typhoon Noru making landfall in Pollilo Islands and Dingalan, Aurora on September 25

- April 9–11, 2022: Tropical Storm Megi (Agaton) meandered through the Visayan islands of Samar, Leyte, Cebu and Bohol, causing widespread flooding and landslides. The storm caused 214 fatalities and damages amounting to ₱4.72 billion (US$90.8 million).
- August 21–24, 2022: Tropical Storm Ma-on (Florita) made landfall on Isabela province in Luzon as a Severe Tropical Storm, before making its way throughout northern Luzon. The storm caused 43 fatalities and damages of up to ₱2.43 billion (US$44 million).
- September 24–26, 2022: Typhoon Noru (Karding) meandered through the Luzon provinces Laguna, Rizal, Quezon, Cavite, Batangas, Metro Manila, Zambales, Bulacan, Pampanga, Pangasinan, Tarlac, Nueva Ecija, Nueva Vizcaya, Bataan and Aurora as a powerful major typhoon, causing widespread flooding and landslides. Damages were up to ₱3.38 billion (US$68.7 million), and 40 were left dead.
- October 10–12, 2022: Tropical Depression Maymay caused heavy rainfall in parts of the country, leaving two dead in Cagayan and causing ₱533 million (US$9.16 million) in damages.
- October 13–17, 2022:Typhoon Nesat (Neneng) made landfall in the Babuyan islands, causing heavy rainfall and flooding in northern Luzon. Overall, damages of ₱474.2 million (US$8.15 million) were recorded.
- October 19–23, 2022: Tropical Depression Obet caused heavy rainfall and some winds in the Babuyan and Batanes Islands. Two were left dead, and damages were minimal.
- October 28–30, 2022: Tropical Storm Nalgae (Paeng) dropped intense to torrential rain across Luzon and Visayas, killing 160 people, and causing ₱13.08 billion (US$265.64 million) in damages.
- October 30- November 1, 2022: The remnants of Tropical Storm Banyan (Queenie) caused rainfall in Mindanao.
- December 10–13, 2022: Tropical Storm Pakhar (Rosal) caused flash flooding in parts of Luzon, indirectly killing eight.

=== 2023 ===
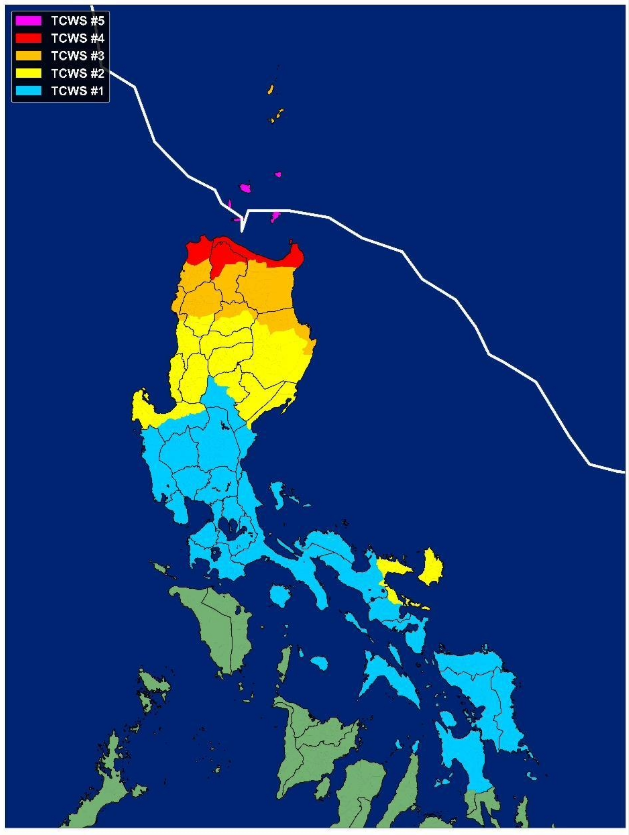
Highest Tropical Cyclone Warning Signal raised by PAGASA across the Philippines in relation to Typhoon Doksuri (Egay)

- April 10–13, 2023: Tropical Depression Amang caused up to ₱50.84 million (US$923 thousand) in agricultural damages, particularly affecting the Bicol region.
- June 3–4, 2023: Typhoon Mawar (Betty) hit Northern Philippines, damaged $126 million worth of goods and killed one person in the Philippines.
- June 6–10, 2023: Typhoon Guchol (Chedeng) enhanced the southwest Monsoon in the Philippines.
- July 12-12, 2023: Tropical Storm Talim (Dodong) crossed over northern Luzon as a monsoonal depression, causing ₱299 million (US$5.75 million) in damages, and killing three.
- July 23–27, 2023: Typhoon Doksuri (Egay) hit northern Philippines, damaged $280 million and killed 56 people in the Philippines.
- August 21–31, 2023: Typhoon Saola (Goring) made a close pass to Luzon as a powerful Super Typhoon, bringing gusty winds and torrential rainfall. Damages were up to ₱2.49 billion (US$43.9 million), with two fatalities and over a million people affected.
- September 28-October 4, 2023: Typhoon Koinu (Jenny) brought gusts and heavy rain to the Batanes and Babuyan islands as a powerful typhoon.
- December 15–18, 2023: Tropical Storm Jelawat (Kabayan) made landfall in Mindanao, bringing heavy rains to the island along with the Visayas. One person was left missing and Jelawat caused nearly US$40,000 in damages.

=== 2024 ===
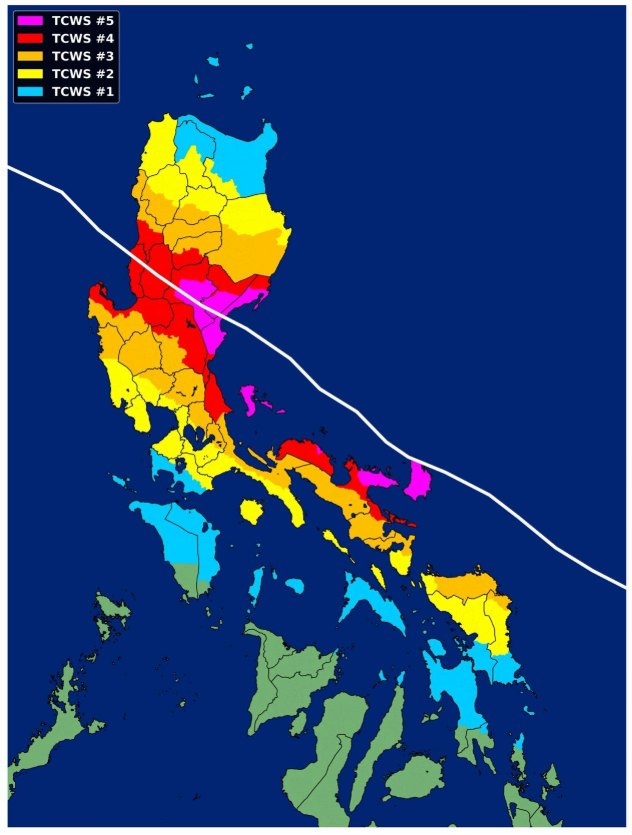
Highest Tropical Cyclone Warning Signal raised by PAGASA across the Philippines in relation to Typhoon Man-yi (Pepito)

- May 25–29, 2024: Typhoon Ewiniar (Aghon) made nine landfalls, affecting the Masbate, and Samar. The typhoon caused six deaths and ₱1.03 billion (US$19.14 million).
- July 19–22, 2024: Typhoon Gaemi (Carina) contributed to the monsoon rainfall over Luzon, killing 48 and causing ₱12.38 billion (US$210 million) in damages across the archipelago.
- July 19–21, 2024: Tropical Storm Prapiroon (Butchoy), along with the aforementioned Gaemi, caused significant rainfall over the Philippines, causing eight deaths (and one missing) and ₱9.45 million (US$191,795.4) in damages.
- September 1–3, 2024: Typhoon Yagi (Enteng) made landfall in northern Luzon, killing 21 and leaving 26 missing. It caused ₱2.96 billion (US$60.08 million) in damages across the country.
- September 16–18, 2024: Tropical Storm Soulik (Gener) swept over northern Luzon, yet again making a landfall in Aurora province. ₱1.11 billion (US$22.63 million) in damages were recorded, along with killing 26 and leaving three missing.
- September 30-October 1, 2024: Typhoon Krathon (Julian) crossed north of Luzon and across the Batanes archipelago, breaking rainfall records in the area from a tropical cyclone. Damages reached ₱1.57 billion (US$31.93 million) and five were left dead with one missing.
- October 20–25, 2024: Tropical Storm Trami (Kristine) made landfall in Isabela province, dumping massive amounts of rainfall across Luzon and Visayas. It killed 162 from its flooding across the country, and ₱17.6 billion (US$357.44 million) in damages were caused, cementing itself as one of the costliest Philippine typhoons. It was the first in a string of six storms to impact the Philippines.
- October 27–30, 2024: Typhoon Kong-rey (Leon) crossed over the Batanes islands as a powerful super typhoon with powerful winds and heavy rainfall, and storm surges in Cagayan and the Batanes archipelago. It was the second in a string of storms to affect the Philippines.
- November 5–8, 2024: Typhoon Yinxing (Marce) was the third in a string of six storms to affect the Philippines, making landfall in Santa Ana as a Category 4. Overall, damages stood at ₱192.73 million (US$3.91 million) and one person was left dead.
- November 11, 2024: Typhoon Toraji (Nika) made landfall in Dilasag, Aurora as a low-end typhoon, the fourth in a string of six storms to affect the nation. Four people were killed.
- November 13-14, 2024: Typhoon Usagi (Ofel) made landfall in Baggao, Cagayan as a strong typhoon.
- November 16-17, 2024: Typhoon Man-yi (Pepito) made two separate landfalls in the country: first at Catanduanes, then at Aurora. 14 people were killed from the typhoon. Together with Toraji (Nika) and Usagi (Ofel), damages in the country reached at least ₱3.63 billion (US$65.32 million).

=== 2025 ===
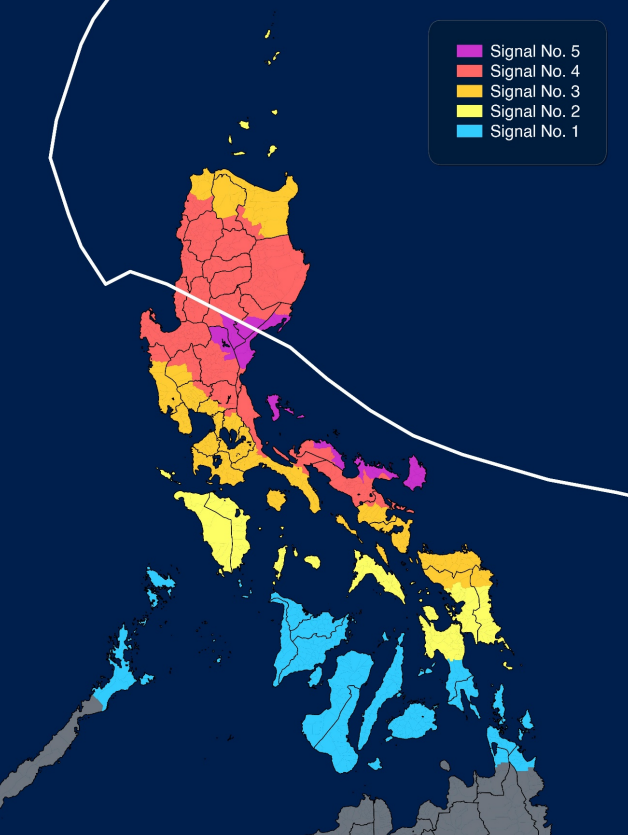
Highest Tropical Cyclone Warning Signal raised by PAGASA across the Philippines in relation to Typhoon Fung-wong (Uwan)

- July 16–19, 2025: Tropical Storm Wipha (Crising) made landfall in the Babuyan Islands, but caused wider damage across Luzon, totaling ₱21.4 billion (US$434 million), and left 40 people dead in combination with Tropical Storm Francisco (Dante), Tropical Storm Co-may (Emong), and the enhancement of the southwest monsoon.
- July 23–27, 2025: Tropical Storm Co-may (Emong) made two landfalls first in Agno, Pangasinan and then in Candon, Ilocos Sur, bringing severe floods.
- August 22–23, 2025: Typhoon Kajiki (Isang) crossed from Casiguran, Aurora to Ilocos Sur, displacing more than 25,000 people across Northern Luzon.
- September 4, 2025: Tropical Storm Tapah (Lannie) formed off Vigan and caused torrential rain in Metro Manila.
- September 16–17, 2025: Tropical Storm Mitag (Mirasol) formed off Legazpi, Albay and made landfall in Casiguran, Aurora, causing widespread damage across Cagayan and Apayao provinces and killing three people in Bukidnon via flooding.
- September 22–24, 2025: Typhoon Ragasa (Nando) made landfall in Calayan, Cagayan as a Category 5 storm, killing 11 people and causing widespread flooding and damage to infrastructure in the far north. It was the second most intense tropical cyclone of the season worldwide, after Hurricane Melissa.
- September 24–26, 2025: Typhoon Bualoi (Opong) made five landfalls as a tropical storm from San Policarpo, Eastern Samar to Mindoro, killing 37 people and causing nearly a billion pesos in damage.
- October 18–19, 2025: Tropical Storm Fengshen (Ramil) brushed through Bicol Region, Southern Tagalog Region, including Metro Manila as a weak tropical storm, claiming the lives of 7 people from drowning and fallen trees.
- November 4–5, 2025: Typhoon Kalmaegi (Tino) made landfalls as a Category 2 storm across a wide swath of the Visayas from Silago, Southern Leyte to Palawan. It left at least 269 people dead, and caused around US$21.4 million in damages, with Cebu among the most impacted provinces.
- November 9–11, 2025: Typhoon Fung-wong (Uwan) struck Aurora province as a Category 3 cyclone, leaving at least 33 Filipinos dead and causing ₱4.91 billion (US$99.63 million) in damage.
- November 24–25, 2025: Typhoon Koto (Verbena) made multiple landfalls across northern Mindanao and Visayas from Bayabas, Surigao del Sur to Palawan, leaving moderate damage in the country.

=== 2026 ===
Tropical Storm Penha (Basyang) moving over the Philippines

- February 5–6, 2026: Tropical Storm Penha (Basyang) brushed through northern Mindanao and Visayas, bringing heavy rains through those areas and killing 12 people, including ₱1.48 billion (US$25.24 million) worth of damages in Surigao del Sur alone.

== Deadliest Storms and Climatology ==
The following lists are the nineteen most deadly and the monthly number of storms that impacted the Philippines from 2000. Storms that are known to have killed at least 100 people are included in this list. Only six storms have exceeded the death toll of 1,000. Total number of deaths recorded are only from the country itself.

Deadliest Storms Affecting the Philippines (2000-present)
Rank / Storm Name (Year)	Number of Deaths
1. Haiyan (Yolanda) (2013)	6,300
2. Bopha (Pablo) (2012)	1,901
3. (Winnie) (2004)	1,593
4. Durian (Reming) (2006)	1,399
5. Fengshen (Frank) (2008)	1,371
6. Washi (Sendong) (2011)	1,268(1,268–1,472)
7. Ketsana (Ondoy) (2009)	671
8. Parma (Pepeng) (2009)	465
9. Rai (Odette) (2021)	410
10. Xangsane (Milenyo) (2006)	279
11. Kalmaegi (Tino) (2025)	269
12. Tembin (Vinta) (2017)	266
13. Megi (Agaton) (2022)	214
14. Lingling (Nanang) (2001)	171
15. Utor (Feria) (2001)	168
16. Nalgae (Paeng) (2022)	164
17. Trami (Kristine) (2024)	162
18. Mangkhut (Ompong) (2018)	127
19. Rammasun (Glenda) (2014)	106

Monthly Number of Storms Affecting the Philippines (2000-present)
Month	Number of Storms
January	12
February	5
March	3
April	7
May	14
June	17
July	37
August	25
September	27
October	22
November	25
December	18

== See also ==
- Typhoon
- Typhoons in the Philippines
  - List of typhoons in the Philippines (1963–1999)
- 2026 Pacific typhoon season
