= Typhoon Parma =

Pacific typhoon in 2009

Typhoon Parma (Pepeng)
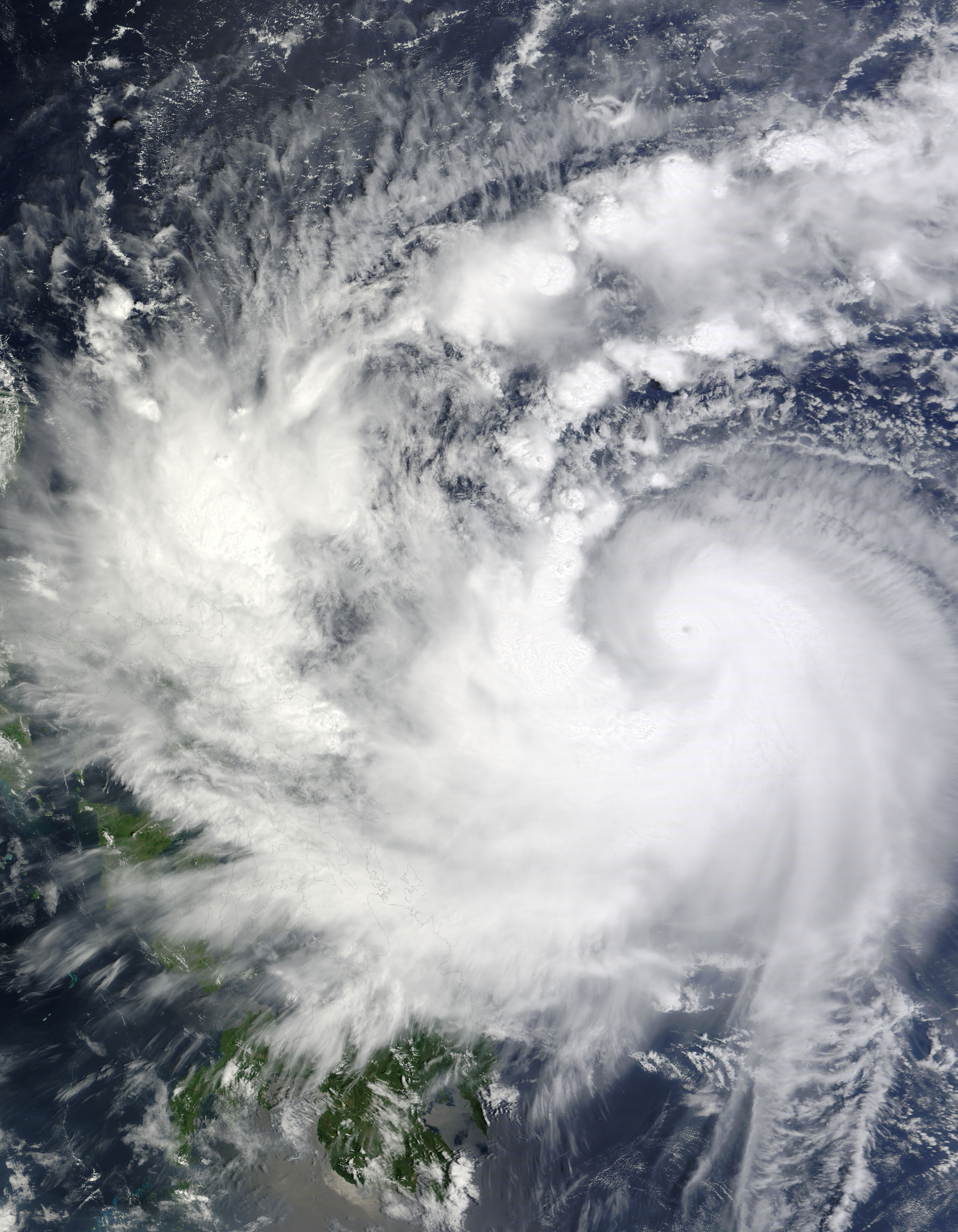
- Parma at peak intensity on October 1

Meteorological history
- Formed: September 27, 2009
- Dissipated: October 14, 2009

Very strong typhoon
- 10-minute sustained (JMA)
- Highest winds: 185 km/h (115 mph)
- Lowest pressure: 930 hPa (mbar); 27.46 inHg

Category 4-equivalent super typhoon
- 1-minute sustained (SSHWS/JTWC)
- Highest winds: 250 km/h (155 mph)
- Lowest pressure: 922 hPa (mbar); 27.23 inHg

Overall effects
- Fatalities: 500 total
- Damage: $617 million (2009 USD)
- Areas affected: Caroline Islands; Philippines; Taiwan; China; Vietnam
- IBTrACS
- Part of the 2009 Pacific typhoon season

Typhoon Parma, (Note: The name Parma was contributed by Macau and refers to Prosciutto di Parma, thinly-sliced ham often with livers and mushrooms in Macanese cuisine.) known in the Philippines as Typhoon Pepeng, (Note: The Japan Meteorological Agency (JMA) assigns names to typhoons in the western Pacific Ocean and north of the equator, as the Regional Specialized Meteorological Centre. PAGASA assigns local names to tropical cyclones in the Philippine Area of Responsibility.) was a strong, deadly and erratic tropical cyclone that became the second-wettest typhoon to affect the Philippines, and the second typhoon to affect the country within the span of a week during September 2009.

Typhoon Parma was named by PAGASA as Pepeng when it entered the Philippine Area of Responsibility days after Typhoon Ketsana wreaked havoc on the country; Parma spared the capital and instead lashed the northern part of Luzon island. Parma added to the damage brought about by the earlier Typhoon Ketsana, affecting thousands of families on the north, especially in the province of Pangasinan where the San Roque Dam inadvertently released water to prevent its breach. However, in the first week of October, Parma interacted with the incoming Typhoon Melor on the Pacific (via a Fujiwhara interaction), rendering it stationary as it made landfall on Southern Taiwan. Days later, the greatly weakened Parma retreated back to Luzon, making further landfalls on Ilocos Norte and Cagayan. The now Severe Tropical Storm Parma then began to wane its strength, as it crossed Luzon island for the second time. It then emerged on the South China Sea as a tropical depression, before restrengthening into a tropical storm and striking Hainan and Vietnam before finally dissipating in October 14.

Parma's bizarre, long-lived, and erratic track over northern Luzon led to near-record levels of rainfall, causing devastating flooding that led to Parma becoming one of the deadliest typhoons to hit the Philippines in a decade. Due to the high death toll and damages, both the JMA and PAGASA retired Parma and Pepeng from their respective naming lists.

== Meteorological history ==
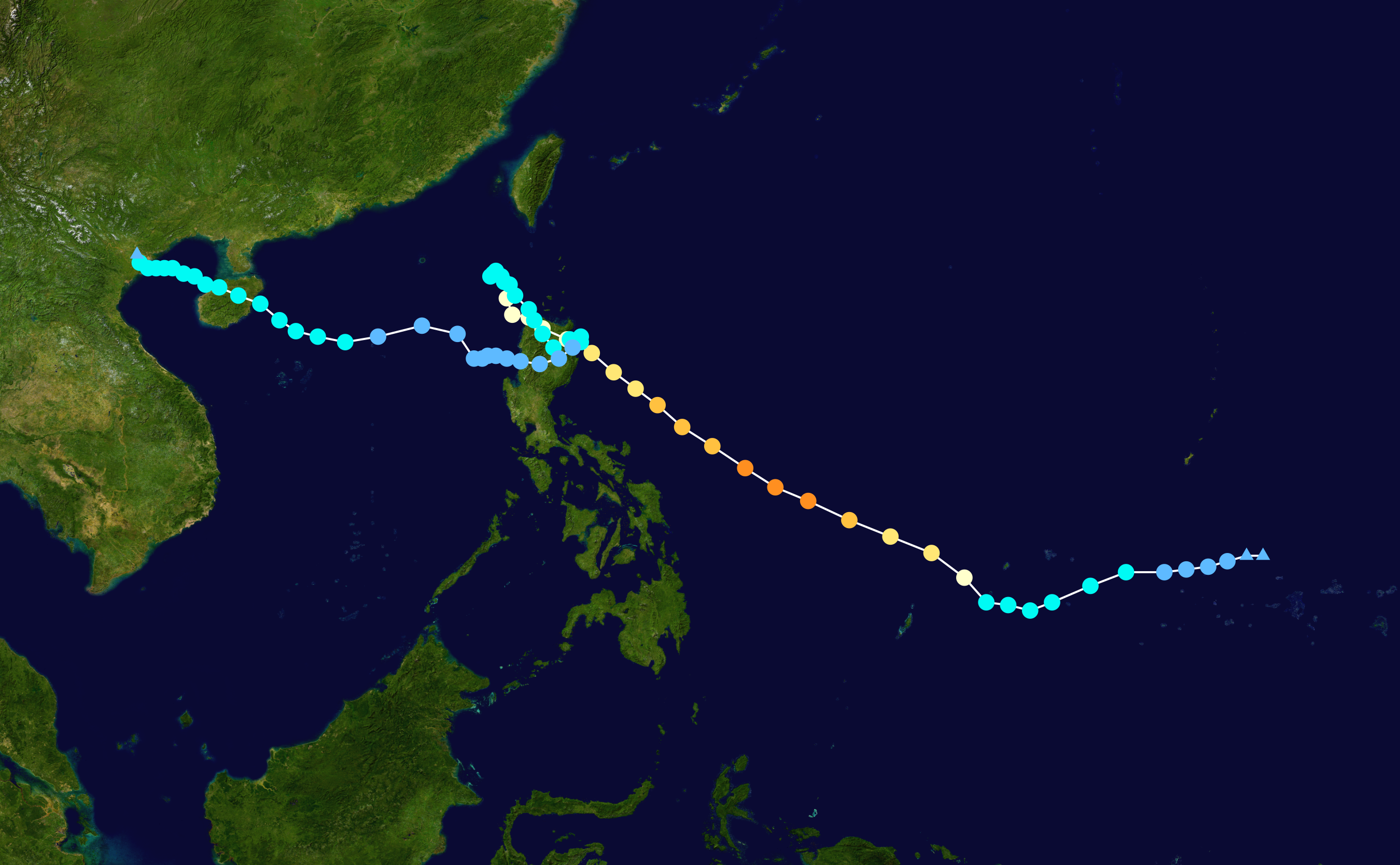
Map plotting the storm's track and intensity, according to the Saffir–Simpson scale Map key Saffir–Simpson scale Tropical depression (≤38 mph, ≤62 km/h) Tropical storm (39–73 mph, 63–118 km/h) Category 1 (74–95 mph, 119–153 km/h) Category 2 (96–110 mph, 154–177 km/h) Category 3 (111–129 mph, 178–208 km/h) Category 4 (130–156 mph, 209–251 km/h) Category 5 (≥157 mph, ≥252 km/h) Unknown Storm type Tropical cyclone Subtropical cyclone Extratropical cyclone, remnant low, tropical disturbance, or monsoon depression

During September 26, the Joint Typhoon Warning Center (JTWC) started to monitor an area of convection that was located about 445 km (275 mi), to the southeast of Guam. The system had an elongated low-level circulation center with convection developing around the center. Upper level analysis showed that the system was located in an area of low vertical wind shear and had a good poleward outflow into a tropical upper tropospheric trough (TUTT). During the next day, convection started to consolidate before both the Japan Meteorological Agency (JMA) and the JTWC initiated advisories on the system, with the JTWC designating it as Tropical Depression 19W. After being classified, the depression remained weak and poorly organized, as it lay close to Tropical Storm 18W. During September 28, as the depression moved away from 18W, the JTWC reported that the depression had intensified into a tropical storm despite it remaining poorly organized, and acquired the name Parma.

Parma started to intensify to a typhoon as it moved closer to the Philippines, and soon underwent rapid intensification as it developed a pinhole eye. On October 1, Parma reached its peak intensity with winds of 250 km/h (155 mph). Afterwards, Parma started a weakening trend as it moved closer to the Philippines, and on October 3 made landfall on northern Luzon, Philippines. During its landfall in the Philippines, Parma began to travel northwest towards China. It slowed down and weakened (due to interactions with Typhoon Melor), then turned back south towards the Philippines. Parma made a second landfall on October 6 with sustained winds of 105 kilometres per hour (65 mph). It weakened to a tropical depression before emerging off the east coast of Luzon on October 7, remaining stationary for a day. On October 8 it made a third landfall the eastern coast of Cagayan, then moved slowly across Luzon, eventually emerging in the South China Sea. After regaining some strength, it travelled westward and hit the island of Hainan, China, with winds of 39 miles per hour (63 km/h). It then made a final landfall in Vietnam on October 13, and dissipated over the country on October 14.

== Preparations ==
=== Caroline Islands ===
Early on September 28, the National Weather Service Weather Forecast Office in Guam using data from the Joint Typhoon Warning Center placed Ulithi, Faraulep and Fais under tropical storm warnings and declared Tropical storm watches for Yap and Ngulu whilst the depression was moving towards the state of Yap. Tropical storm warnings were then declared for Yap and Ngulu later that morning as the depression was moving to the northwest of Faraulep. These warnings stayed in effect until early the next day when they canceled the warnings for Faraulep, Fais and Ulithi after the depression had intensified into a named storm, and had passed by the islands. NWS Guam then placed Koror and Kayangel under a tropical storm watch later that day before cancelling all warnings early on September 30.

=== Philippines ===
Costliest Philippine typhoons
Rank	Storm	Season	Damage		Ref.
Rank	Storm	Season	PHP	USD	Ref.
1	Yolanda (Haiyan)	2013	₱95.5 billion	$2.98 billion	
2	Odette (Rai)	2021	₱51.7 billion	$968 million	
3	Glenda (Rammasun)	2014	₱38.6 billion	$771 million	
4	Pablo (Bopha)	2012	₱36.9 billion	$724 million	
5	Ompong (Mangkhut)	2018	₱33.9 billion	$627 million	
6	Pepeng (Parma)	2009	₱27.3 billion	$591 million	
7	Ulysses (Vamco)	2020	₱20.2 billion	$420 million	
8	Crising (Wipha)	2025	₱18.4 billion	$373 million	
9	Kristine (Trami)	2024	₱18.4 billion	$373 million	
10	Rolly (Goni)	2020	₱17.9 billion	$371 million	

The National Disaster Coordinating Council (NDCC) advised all local government officials across Luzon to evacuate people if needed to ensure their safety. In addition to the NDCC, they gave out relief goods and other necessities. President Gloria Macapagal Arroyo also requested PAGASA to monitor the super typhoon every two hours and update its website. Also, the Philippine Atmospheric, Geophysical and Astronomical Services Administration (PAGASA) advised all areas with public storm signals to be alerted against storm surges, landslides, and flash floods. The Coast Guard placed the entire country under red alert, meaning that the agency would monitor the whole country, especially Northern and Central Luzon. All ferry stations with routes from Luzon to Visayas and vice versa suspended operations, and fishermen were advised not to go to sea to avoid turbulent waves.

As preparations continued, different dams were opened and large amounts of water freed to avoid the overflowing of dams. In Isabela, the Magat Dam released a large amount of water. Its water was projected to pass through Cagayan River, forcing locals along the river to evacuate. The Angat Dam in Bulacan also released large amounts of water, flooding the towns of Calumpit and Hagonoy. Local officials took evacuated people living in the area. Five barangays in Nueva Ecija were already flooded due to water from Pantabangan Dam, which released 250 cubic meters per second from 1 pm on October 1, 05:00 (UTC) to 1 am on October 2, 17:00 (UTC). Local officials also took charge to evacuate people. In Laguna, the Caliraya Dam released water as a precaution against Parma's heavy rains, even though Laguna would not be directly affected by the super typhoon. On the morning of October 2, President Gloria Macapagal — Arroyo declared the whole country under a state of calamity.

In Metro Manila, billboards were rolled down due to strong winds that were anticipated. Air travel, cargo ships, and other water transport throughout the Islands were suspended. The Commission on Higher Education (CHED) suspended classes for regions 1, 2, 3, 4a, 4b, 5 and CAR. In Laguna, the Laguna Lake Development Authority (LLDA) evacuated a massive 100,000 residents living near Laguna de Bay.

=== Taiwan ===
Following the devastating impacts of Typhoon Morakot in August, residents in southern Taiwan were weary upon hearing of a new typhoon approaching the region. By October 3, residents of six villages in the hard hit county of Kaohsiung began evacuating. The following day, the Central Weather Bureau issued a land warning for the Hengchun Peninsula as Parma moved over the northern Philippines. Residents in the region were advised to prepare for heavy rains and high winds in relation to the storm. At least 55 international flights from Taiwanese airports were cancelled or delayed due to Typhoon Parma as it stalled in the Bashih Channel. On October 5, mandatory evacuations were put in place for portions of southern Taiwan, leading to roughly 6,000 residents leaving the area for shelter. Emergency officials deployed 200 elite soldiers to the region to assist in the evacuation and placed 35,000 more on standby for relief operations.

== Impact ==
=== Caroline Islands ===
Typhoon Parma casualties in the Philippines

NDCC death tally
Region
Deaths
Region I
95
CAR
346
Region III
19
Region IV-A
1
Region V
4
Total
465

Damages
	Amount
Agriculture	₱5,106,746,713.93 ($108,538,654.92)
Infrastructure	₱14,516,879,535.98 ($308,541,541.68)
Private	₱2,770,000 ($58,873.54)
Total damages	₱19,626,396,249.91 ($417,139,070.14)

While it was a Tropical Storm, Parma passed to the south of the westernmost state of Yap, battering the east coast of the main island with torrential rain and winds of up to 95 km/h (60 mph). As a result, Continental Micronesia cancelled its scheduled passenger flight to Guam, while the governor of Yap ordered that government employees stay at home and that residents take all precautions that were possible while placing Yap under the highest state of storm alerts.

=== Philippines ===
Wettest tropical cyclones and their remnants in the Philippine islands Highest-known totals
Precipitation			Storm	Location	Ref.
Rank	mm	in	Storm	Location	Ref.
1	2210.0	87.01	July 1911 cyclone	Baguio	
2	1854.3	73.00	Pepeng (Parma) (2009)	Baguio	
3	1216.0	47.86	Trining (Carla) (1967)	Baguio	
4	1116.0	43.94	Iliang (Zeb) (1998)	La Trinidad, Benguet	
5	1085.8	42.74	Feria (Utor) (2001)	Baguio	
6	1077.8	42.43	Lando (Koppu) (2015)	Baguio	
7	1012.7	39.87	Igme (Mindulle) (2004)		
8	902.0	35.51	Dante (Kujira) (2009)		
9	879.9	34.64	September 1929 typhoon	Virac, Catanduanes	
10	869.6	34.24	Openg (Dinah) (1977)	Western Luzon	

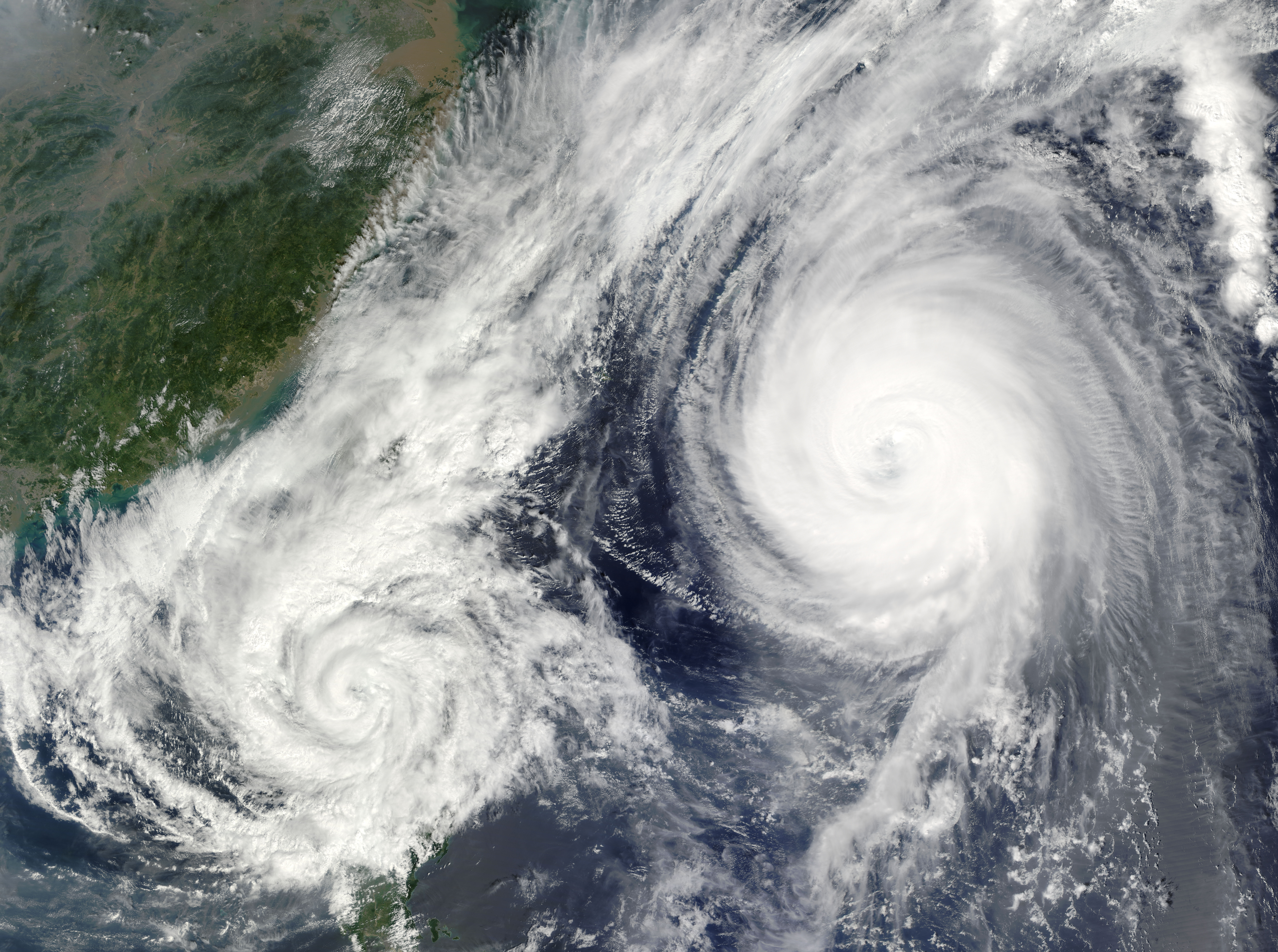
Severe Tropical Storm Parma interacting with Typhoon Melor on October 7, 2009.

Even though Parma was still too far to make its landfall in northern Philippines, various transportation was suspended before the super typhoon draw near. In Catanduanes, where the first signal warning no.3 was raised, the province's power and communications were cut. Fallen trees were already in the main roads. About 30,000 families were evacuated. In addition to the Bicol region, more than 2,000 passengers were stranded in ferry stations. 39 provinces including Metro Manila were put to signal warnings, with each place experienced massive rainfall with strong winds. Parma made its landfall at Northeastern Cagayan at 3:00pm PST/07:00 (UTC). In Cagayan, at least 6,036 people in 39 barangays (villages) were affected, while P20.33 million worth of agricultural produce were destroyed. Also, the Chico River was swelled due to the typhoon, making the Maguilling Overflow Bridge along the Cagayan–Apayao Road impassable. The Maharlika Highway in Ilagan, Isabela to Cagayan became hardly passable due to the trees and electric posts that fell when Pepeng battered the area. Total power interruption also crippled the provinces of Kalinga, Apayao, and the northern towns of Isabela. In Kalinga, landslides were reported on roads linking the provincial capital, Tabuk, to upland towns. In Zambales, at least 2,100 families were evacuated as Pepeng brought heavy rains causing the Bucao River to swell. The Carael section of the Zambales highway became impassable due to rising floodwaters. Due to heavy downpour, the San Roque Dam in Eastern Pangasinan and Pantabangan Dam in Nueva Ecija was forced to release huge amount of water. It caused major flooding in Tarlac which is their neighbouring province and also caused flooding Eastern and Central Pangasinan as well as Nueva Ecija. In Metro Manila the area is still experienced torrential rains and strong winds. Floodwaters continue to rise in some areas in Metro Manila and Calabarzon. In Pateros, Muntinlupa, and Taguig, in Taytay town in Rizal province, and in the towns of Biñan and San Pedro in Laguna province, the flood is not subsiding. Laguna de Bay is breaking a 90-year record in meters of water, which threatens to submerge more areas in Metro Manila. In Benguet, a landslide killed at least 200 as Tropical Depression Parma continues to bring rain across northern Luzon. Due to severe flooding, Leptospirosis became a problem that affected many. In Pasig City General Hospital alone, 30 people have been taken in for diagnosis. The Department of Health announced that there is a Leptospirosis outbreak in Marikina.

=== Taiwan ===
Torrential rainfall fell across southern Taiwan as Typhoon Parma stalled south of the island. In some areas, more than 500 mm (20 in) of rain fell, resulting in floods up to .5 m (1.6 ft) deep. These floods prompted emergency evacuations in hundreds of villages throughout Taiwan. After 200 mm (7.9 in) of rain fell in Yilan County, emergency officials enacted the first mandatory evacuation in northern Taiwan, relocating hundreds of residents. Several landslides were reported in mountainous regions, mainly in southern parts of the island. Military convoys loaded with sandbags traveled to rising rivers to help reinforce them and prevent them from overflowing their banks. As a result of the continuous rainfall and cloud cover, temperatures across Taiwan fell below average.

Off the coast of Taiwan, a ship carrying 14 people sank after being battered by rough seas produced by Typhoon Parma. One person was confirmed dead, three were rescued and ten others were listed as missing.

=== China ===
Off the cost of Hainan Island, a ship carrying nine people capsized. Three people were confirmed to have drowned, five were rescued and one other remains missing.

=== Vietnam ===
Typhoon Parma made its final landfall near Hai Phong on October 15 after causing damage to Bach Long Vi island where 62 fishing boats were sunk. No deaths were reported.

== Retirement ==
Due to the large number of fatalities and damage caused by the storm, the names Parma and Pepeng were later retired. The committee selected the name In-fa to replace "Parma" on the Western Pacific basin name lists beginning in 2011. For the PAGASA, on 2012, the name chosen to replace "Pepeng" was Paolo for the 2013 season.

== See also ==
- Effects of the 2009 Pacific typhoon season in the Philippines
- Tropical cyclones in 2009
- List of the wettest tropical cyclones
- List of Philippine typhoons (2000–present)
