= September 1929 Philippines typhoon =

Western Pacific typhoon in 1929

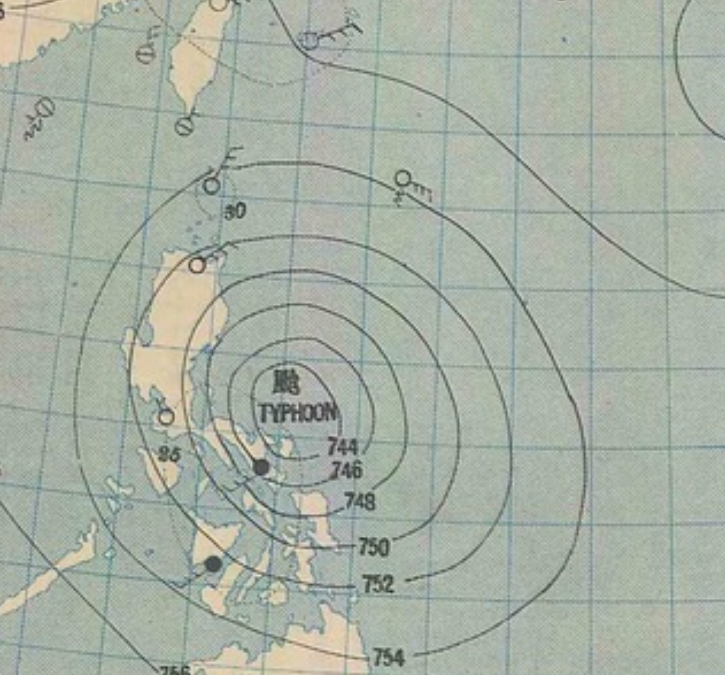
- The typhoon, nearing landfall on the Bicol Region on September 01

Meteorological history
- Formed: August 31, 1929
- Dissipated: September 6, 1929

Unknown-strength storm
- Lowest pressure: 954.62 hPa (mbar); 28.19 inHg

Overall effects
- Fatalities: 120 reported
- Missing: 210
- Damage: >$800,000 (1929 USD)
- Areas affected: Philippine Islands, Republic of China
- Part of the 1929 Pacific typhoon season

The September 1929 Philippines typhoon was a destructive tropical cyclone that killed over 200 individuals in the Philippine Islands during the 1929 Pacific typhoon season. It was first noted on August 31 to the east of Manila while moving to the west. It then became a typhoon while turning to the west-northwest, hitting the Bicol Region while recording a minimum barometric pressure of 954.62 hPa early the next day on Polillo, Quezon. After crossing the archipelago, it turned to the northwest before dissipating through the weather maps on September 6.

The damages caused by the typhoon were described as intensive. Strong winds and flash floods were seen in Infanta and Polillo, both in Tayabas (present-day Quezon Province), respectively. A dam also overflowed in the area, causing catastrophic damage. The fury of the storm was also experienced in the other parts of Luzon. The water supply in Manila was affected, causing a major crisis. The typhoon also set a record for the ninth wettest tropical cyclone in the Philippines, which is recorded in Virac, Catanduanes. The numerical damages were estimated at $800,000, 1929 USD with 120 deaths and 210 missing.

== Meteorological history ==
While the storm's intensity was uncertain, the typhoon was first noted on August 31 as a persistent low on weather maps, roughly 350 miles to the east of Manila, Philippine Islands. On the next day, it dramatically strengthened to a typhoon as it started to move slowly to the west.

Over the next hours, the circulation of the system increased, as being evidenced by weather maps. Early on September 2, it slightly turned west-northwestward due to another system brewing in its east. At the same time, an aneroid barometer located in Polillo, Tayabas recorded a minimum barometric pressure of 716 millimetres (28.2 inches) while in a calm condition (possibly in the typhoon's eye). At 22:00 UTC that day (6:00 am PHT), the typhoon passed near the northern coasts of Camarines Norte and Infanta, Tayabas before heading out to the South China Sea. The storm passed through the Paracel Islands before turning to the northwest. It then slowed down again before turning westward, before disappearing on weather maps by September 6 as it entered the Gulf of Tonkin.

== Impact ==
Wettest tropical cyclones and their remnants in the Philippine islands Highest-known totals
| Precipitation | | | Storm | Location | Ref. |
| Rank | mm | in | Storm | Location | Ref. |
|---|---|---|---|---|---|
| 1 | 2210.0 | 87.01 | July 1911 cyclone | Baguio | |
| 2 | 1854.3 | 73.00 | Pepeng (Parma) (2009) | Baguio | |
| 3 | 1216.0 | 47.86 | Trining (Carla) (1967) | Baguio | |
| 4 | 1116.0 | 43.94 | Iliang (Zeb) (1998) | La Trinidad, Benguet | |
| 5 | 1085.8 | 42.74 | Feria (Utor) (2001) | Baguio | |
| 6 | 1077.8 | 42.43 | Lando (Koppu) (2015) | Baguio | |
| 7 | 1012.7 | 39.87 | Igme (Mindulle) (2004) | | |
| 8 | 902.0 | 35.51 | Dante (Kujira) (2009) | | |
| 9 | 879.9 | 34.64 | September 1929 typhoon | Virac, Catanduanes | |
| 10 | 869.6 | 34.24 | Openg (Dinah) (1977) | Western Luzon | |

Very destructive damage was seen and reported in Luzon following the typhoon's approach and pass during September 2 and 3. Gusty winds and flash floods were experienced by inhabitants throughout Infanta and Polillo, all in Tayabas, respectively. In addition, a dam burst in Bulacan due to heavy rainfall, causing an unknown number of deaths and widespread damage. Many villages in the path of the typhoon were either washed out or destroyed by storm surges and floods. In other parts of Luzon, the fury of the typhoon wasn't large but still experienced, being described as "very extraordinary" by some authorities. The Philippines' Chapter of American Red Cross also reported that many families were without food due to the storm. Adding on, the water supply in the capital Manila was heavily affected, causing a wide crisis. Some mountain ranges to the east of the capital were narrowly damaged due to heavy rains. Railways were also damaged and washed out, which costs over $500,000.

The government of Sorsogon reported heavy damage to the province, including destroyed houses and infrastructures, and washed out croplands. The governor of the said province estimated the monetary damages to be at ₱300,000 ($150,000, 1929 USD). After the communications were restored through the province, some residents said that almost 80% of the sugar crops were destroyed and many individuals were homeless. The same situation in Sorsogon was also seen in Pampanga and other nearby provinces.

The steamer "Mayon" sank off the coast of Luzon near the municipality of Pasacao in Camarines Sur, following the rough seas from the typhoon. Out of the 28 crews and passengers on the boat, 21 were rescued and the others were rendered missing. Newspapers at that time show that over 120 were dead, and 210 were listed as missing or unknown. Incomplete total damages from the storm were estimated at $800,000 (1929 USD).

The typhoon set a record in the country as the ninth-wettest tropical cyclone to hit the archipelago, which is both recorded at Virac, Catanduanes and Daet, Camarines Norte. The station of the former reported nearly 880 millimetres (35 inches) of rain over September 1 and 2, while the latter at 595.9 millimetres (23.46 inches), respectively. Infanta, Tayabas also recorded amounts of rain accumulations, but the numerical totals were unknown, mainly due to the rain gauge being swept away by the strong winds from the typhoon.

== Aftermath ==
Following the aftermath of the typhoon, the emergency supplies donated by the American Red Cross were speeded to be given to the residents of the most damaged areas. The business sectors were concerned, due to the areas that are still isolated for their deliveries. In addition, Governor-General Dwight F. Davis gave an assurance to the Filipinos that the relief operations will be swift and fast, after the typhoon.

== See also ==
- 1929 Pacific typhoon season
