= Tropical Storm Utor (2001) =

Pacific severe tropical storm in 2001

Severe Tropical Storm Utor (Feria)
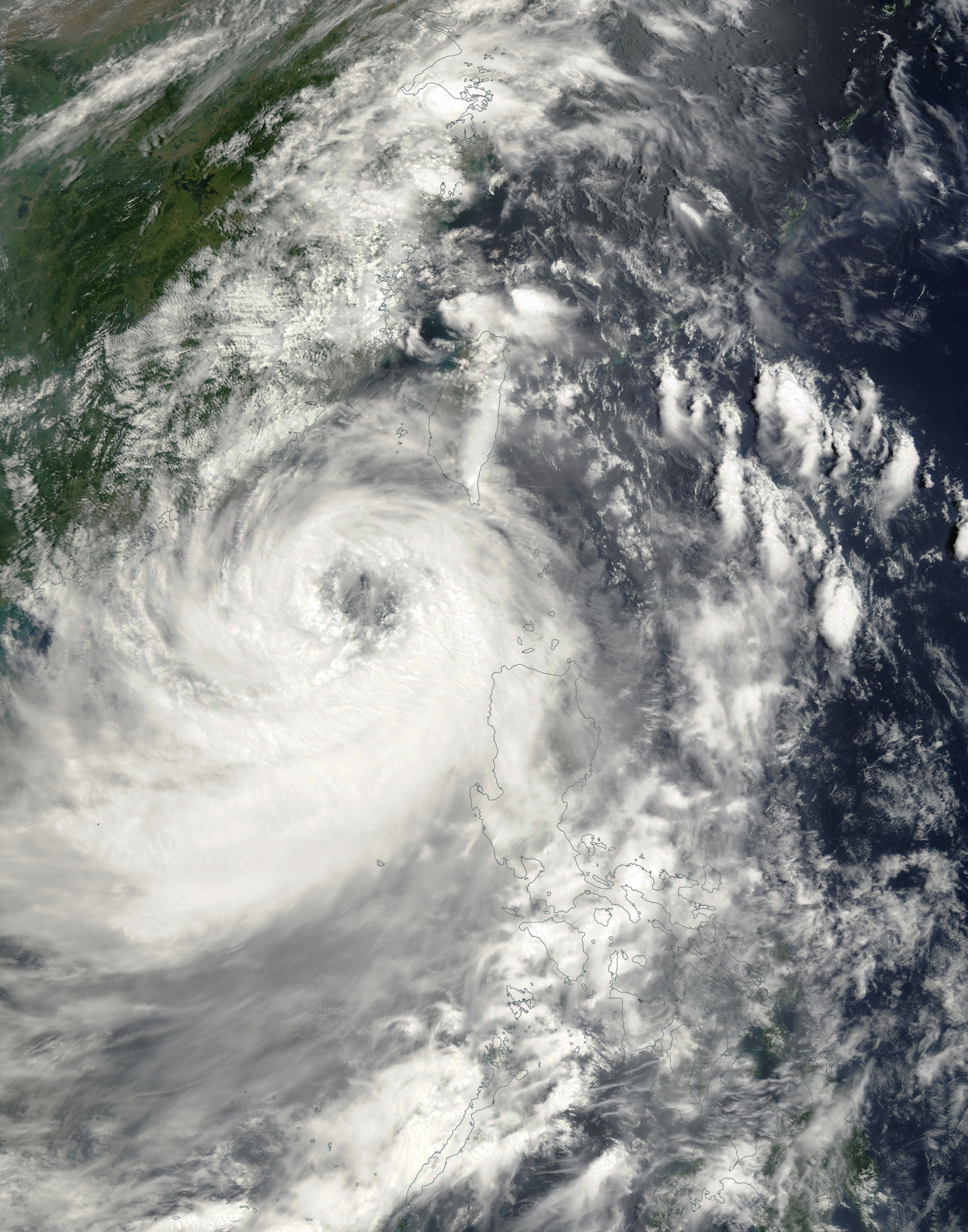
- Tropical Storm Utor shortly after peak intensity on July 5

Meteorological history
- Formed: July 1, 2001
- Dissipated: July 7, 2001

Severe tropical storm
- 10-minute sustained (JMA)
- Highest winds: 110 km/h (70 mph)
- Lowest pressure: 960 hPa (mbar); 28.35 inHg

Category 1-equivalent typhoon
- 1-minute sustained (SSHWS/JTWC)
- Highest winds: 150 km/h (90 mph)
- Lowest pressure: 963 hPa (mbar); 28.44 inHg

Overall effects
- Fatalities: 223 total
- Damage: $2.81 billion (2001 USD)
- Areas affected: Philippines, China and Taiwan
- IBTrACS
- Part of the 2001 Pacific typhoon season

Severe Tropical Storm Utor, (Note: The name Utor (Marshallese: uto̧r, [wudˠɒrʷ]) was contributed by the United States and means squall line in Marshallese.) known in the Philippines as Typhoon Feria, was a large and deadly system that caused heavy rains and landslides throughout the Philippines, Taiwan, and China in early-July 2001. The eighth tropical depression and fourth named storm of the 2001 Pacific typhoon season, Utor formed on July 1 and intensified into a tropical storm shortly after. Utor was upgraded to a typhoon by the JTWC on July 3, and a day later, Utor was estimated to have peaked with 10-min winds of 110 km/h (70 mph), with the JTWC estimating 1-min winds of 150 km/h (95 mph). After passing just north of Luzon, Utor began to weaken, before making landfall on the district of Dapeng as a minimal typhoon.

In Philippines, 188 people were killed, including 29 people in Baguio. Damage was estimated at $70.3 million. In China, 33 deaths were reported, including 23 in Guangdong and 10 in Guangxi. In Hong Kong, 87 flights were canceled.

== Meteorological history ==
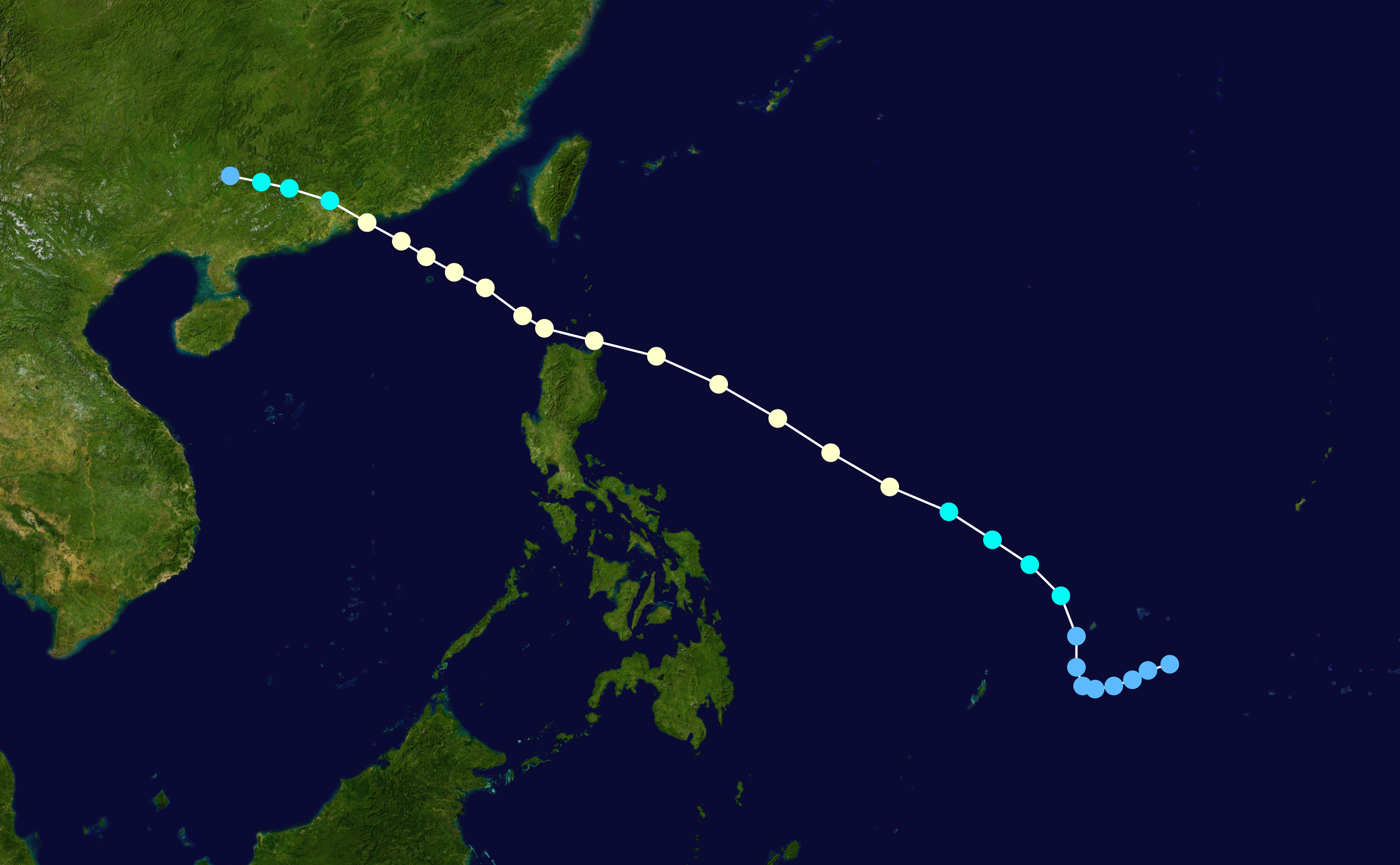
Map plotting the storm's track and intensity, according to the Saffir–Simpson scale Map key Saffir–Simpson scale Tropical depression (≤38 mph, ≤62 km/h) Tropical storm (39–73 mph, 63–118 km/h) Category 1 (74–95 mph, 119–153 km/h) Category 2 (96–110 mph, 154–177 km/h) Category 3 (111–129 mph, 178–208 km/h) Category 4 (130–156 mph, 209–251 km/h) Category 5 (≥157 mph, ≥252 km/h) Unknown Storm type Tropical cyclone Subtropical cyclone Extratropical cyclone, remnant low, tropical disturbance, or monsoon depression

At 21:30 UTC on June 26, the Joint Typhoon Warning Center (JTWC) began monitoring a system in the Western Pacific Ocean. On June 29 at 12:30 UTC, the JTWC issued a Tropical Cyclone Formation Alert (TCFA) on the system. The system continued moving to the southwest and on July 1 at 0:00 UTC both the Japan Meteorological Agency (JMA) and the JTWC upgraded the system to a tropical storm, with the JMA giving it the name Utor. Shortly after being named, Utor abruptly turned to the north, passing just west of the island of Yap. On the next day at 6:00 UTC, Utor entered the Philippine Area of Responsibility and was named Feria by the Philippine Atmospheric, Geophysical and Astronomical Services Administration (PAGASA), which also began issuing advisories. Utor steered northwestward as it was gradually strengthening, being upgraded to a typhoon by the JTWC east of Luzon on July 3. The JMA followed suit, upgrading it to a severe tropical storm. Utor continued to strengthen as it continued northwestward, and on July 4, Utor made its closest approach to the island of Luzon, peaking in the process with 10-min winds of 110 km/h (70 mph), with the JTWC estimating 1-min winds of 150 km/h (95 mph). Utor developed a ragged eye during peak intensity, with the island of Calayan being in the eye. After peak intensity, Utor slowed down slightly, beginning to weaken as it approached the Chinese province of Guangdong. On July 6 at 0:00 UTC, Utor made landfall on the district of Dapeng as a minimal typhoon, quickly weakening over land. At 18:00 UTC, the JTWC issued its final warning on the system, and the JMA followed suit not long after. Utor dissipated over the autonomous region of Guangxi.

== Impacts ==
=== Philippines ===
Wettest tropical cyclones and their remnants in the Philippine islands Highest-known totals
| Precipitation | | | Storm | Location | Ref. |
| Rank | mm | in | Storm | Location | Ref. |
|---|---|---|---|---|---|
| 1 | 2210.0 | 87.01 | July 1911 cyclone | Baguio | |
| 2 | 1854.3 | 73.00 | Pepeng (Parma) (2009) | Baguio | |
| 3 | 1216.0 | 47.86 | Trining (Carla) (1967) | Baguio | |
| 4 | 1116.0 | 43.94 | Iliang (Zeb) (1998) | La Trinidad, Benguet | |
| 5 | 1085.8 | 42.74 | Feria (Utor) (2001) | Baguio | |
| 6 | 1077.8 | 42.43 | Lando (Koppu) (2015) | Baguio | |
| 7 | 1012.7 | 39.87 | Igme (Mindulle) (2004) | | |
| 8 | 902.0 | 35.51 | Dante (Kujira) (2009) | | |
| 9 | 879.9 | 34.64 | September 1929 typhoon | Virac, Catanduanes | |
| 10 | 869.6 | 34.24 | Openg (Dinah) (1977) | Western Luzon | |

Overall, 188 people were killed, 241 were injured, and 44 were reported missing. A total of 12,774 homes were damaged, and another 39,147 homes were partially damaged. Total damage was estimated at $70.3 million (₱3.5 billion). (Note: Money values converted via Pacific Exchange Rate Service with an exchange rate for 2001) Utor, while not a very strong storm, brought heavy rain causing many landslides and flooding throughout the countries it affected. Almost 1 million people spread out over 20 provinces in the Philippines were affected by the typhoon. At least 17 landslides occurred throughout the Philippines.

In Baguio, the storm killed 29 people and injured 44 others, rainfall from Utor set a new 24-hour rain record. One person died in Bokod, and nine people were reported missing in Atok, Benguet. Three people were missing in Tublay, and two others were reported missing in Tuba, Benguet. Flooding affected 14 villages across the towns of Minalin, Macabebe, and Santo Tomas in Pampanga, with water levels reaching at least of 2 ft (0.61 m). The storm killed 14 people in Ilocos Sur and 12 in Pangasinan, including five people in Mangaldan and two in Asingan. Six people were reported dead in Abra, and two were killed in Zambales. Another two deaths were reported in Mountain Province. In Ifugao, crop damage was estimated at ₱21.06 million. Agricultural damage in Cagayan and Isabela Provinces was estimated at ₱254 million. Due to the effects of the storm, on August 13, President Gloria Macapagal Arroyo declared a state of calamity in the Ilocos Region and in the Cordillera Administrative Region.

=== Hong Kong and China ===
During Utor's passage, a 980 hPa reading was recorded in Hong Kong. A total of 87 flights were canceled and 402 more were delayed due to the storm on July 6 in Hong Kong, with crops, roads, power lines, and other infrastructure in Guangdong being heavily damaged. Across Guangdong and Guangxi, 33 people were killed and 104,150 homes were destroyed. In Guangdong, 23 people were killed and 1448 were injured, while damage amounted to ¥6.7 billion (US$813 million) (2001 USD). In Guangxi, economic losses were estimated at ¥16 billion (US$1.93 billion) (2001 USD). Ten people being killed and another 6,850 people were injured in the region. In Nanning, the Yong River rose to 5.4 meters above its danger level, the highest it has reached in 50 years.

=== Taiwan ===
Agricultural losses in Taiwan amounted to NT$68 million (US$2 thousand) (2001 USD). Two people were killed and six were injured due to torrential rains and strong winds.
