= List of named storms (K) =

Storms are named for historical reasons to avoid confusion when communicating with the public, as more than one storm can exist at a time. Names are drawn in order from predetermined lists. For tropical cyclones, names are assigned when a system has one-, three-, or ten-minute winds of more than 65 km/h (40 mph). Standards, however, vary from basin to basin. For example, some tropical depressions are named in the Western Pacific, while within the Australian and Southern Pacific regions, the naming of tropical cyclones are delayed until they have gale-force winds occurring more than halfway around the storm center.

This list covers the letter K.

== Storms ==
Note: † indicates the name was retired after that usage in the respective basin

- Kabayan

- 2003 – struck Japan.
- 2007 – struck the Philippines.
- 2011 – approached Japan, China and Korea.
- 2015 – a destructive Category 4 typhoon that formed just east of the Philippines and made landfall in Guangdong, China
- 2019 – formed after 3 storms devastated the Philippines with heavy rains.
- 2023 – a weak tropical storm which caused heavy rainfall throughout Mindanao and Visayas.

- Kadiang

- 1981 – strong, late-season typhoon which affected Mindanao as a remnant low.
- 1993 – a minimal but erratic typhoon which devastated the Philippines and killed at least 500 people due to flooding.

- Kading

- 1974 – a weak tropical storm that affected in the Vietnam.
- 1978† – one of the most intense tropical cyclones ever recorded, caused much damage in the Philippines.

- Kaemi

- 2000 – a weak tropical storm that made landfall in Vietnam.
- 2006 – a strong Category 1 typhoon struck Taiwan and China.

- Kai-tak

- 2000 – brushed the coasts of mainland China and Taiwan.
- 2005 – a strong tropical cyclone that made landfall in Vietnam and affected the nearby South China and Laos in early-November 2005.
- 2012 – a mild tropical cyclone that affected China, Vietnam and Laos.
- 2017† – a late-season tropical cyclone that affected Visayas during December 2017.

- Kajiki

- 2001 – a weak tropical storm in late 2001.
- 2007 – struck Iwo Jima.
- 2014 – a storm which headed towards Philippines, killing 6 people.
- 2019 – an erratic storm which affected Vietnam, and caused many floodings in the Philippines.
- 2025 – a Category 2 typhoon skirted Hainan Island and made landfall in Vietnam.

- Kalmaegi

- 2002 – did not make landfall.
- 2008 – struck Taiwan and China.
- 2014 – a storm which brought flooding in southeast Asia during mid-September.
- 2019 – impacted northern Philippines during mid-November.
- 2025† – a deadly and destructive typhoon that heavily impacted Visayas in the Philippines, and later in Central Vietnam.

- Kalunde (2003) – a powerful tropical cyclone that minimal affected Rodrigues Island.
- Kamisy (1984) – was considered the worst tropical cyclone to affect northern Madagascar since 1911.
- Kammuri

- 2002 – killed hundreds of people in the wake of a deadly flood season in China.
- 2008 – struck China and Vietnam.
- 2014 – did not make landfall.
- 2019† – made landfall in the Bicol Region of the Philippines at peak intensity as a category 4-equivalent typhoon.

- Kanto (2025) – remained over open waters
- Kara

- 1969 – Category 2 hurricane, brought storm surge and flooding to coastal North Carolina while moving offshore.
- 2007 – Category 3 severe tropical cyclone, formed off the Kimberley coast.

- Karding

- 2014 – tropical depression that affected southern China
- 2018 – a damaging tropical storm that impacted Philippines from enhanced southwest monsoon and China.
- 2022† – a Category 5-equivalent typhoon that impacted the Philippines, Vietnam, Cambodia and Thailand.

- Karen

- 1948 – remained over open waters.
- 1952 – struck South Korea and Japan.
- 1956 – crossed northern Philippines.
- 1960 – left 56 dead and 7,000 homeless in the Philippines.
- 1962† – destroyed 95% of the buildings on Guam.
- 1964 – did not make landfall.
- 1977 – a Category 3 tropical cyclone that hit Australia.
- 1989 – formed near Isla de la Juventud.
- 1995 – minimal storm that was absorbed by Hurricane Iris.
- 2001 – made landfall at Nova Scotia as a tropical storm.
- 2004 – struck China.
- 2007 – Category 1 hurricane in the tropical Atlantic.
- 2008 – struck the Philippines and Hong Kong.
- 2012 – Category 5 super typhoon that made landfall in South Korea.
- 2013 – formed in the Gulf of Mexico.
- 2016† – destructive Category 4 typhoon that struck the Philippines, South China, and Vietnam.
- 2019 – briefly affected Puerto Rico before moving out to sea.
- 2025 – weak and short-lived storm that formed farther north than any Atlantic hurricane on record and did not affect land.

- Karim (2022) – remained over the open ocean.
- Karina

- 2008 – did not make landfall.
- 2014 – a Category 1 hurricane mostly stayed at sea.
- 2020 – did not make landfall.
- 2026 – a Category 4 hurricane that moved into the Central Pacific.

- Karing

- 1963 – a Category 5-equivalent super typhoon that made landfall on the Korean Peninsula as a Category 1 typhoon.
- 1967 – made landfall on Luzon.
- 1971 – curved away from the Philippines.
- 1975 – dissipated off the coast of China.
- 1979 – crossed the Philippines twice.
- 1991 – a Category 5 super typhoon that curved away from the Philippines.
- 1995 – made landfall in southern China, causing 23 fatalities.
- 1999 – was rated a tropical storm by the JTWC.

- Karl

- 1980 – moved across the central Atlantic; caused no significant effects on land.
- 1998 – travelled from north of Bermuda to near the Azores; caused no significant effects on land.
- 2004 – formed in the mid-Atlantic and turned north, reaching Category 4 strength in open water before hitting the Faroe Islands as an extratropical storm; caused no significant damage on land.
- 2010 – formed in the Caribbean Sea on a path that took it over the Yucatán Peninsula and into the Gulf of Mexico, where it rapidly strengthened to Category 3 before making landfall near Veracruz, Mexico.
- 2016 – long-lived but disorganized tropical storm, travelled from near Cape Verde to east of Bermuda; caused no significant effects on land.
- 2022 – formed in the Bay of Campeche, moved north-northwestward before reversing course and following a south-southwestward path

- Kate

- 1945 – struck Japan.
- 1951 – affected Japan.
- 1955 – a powerful category 4 typhoon that hit the Philippines, Hainan and Vietnam.
- 1959 – affected Philippines.
- 1962 (March) – South-West Indian Ocean cyclone that struck eastern Madagascar.
- 1962 (July) – were extensive as the storm killed 110 residents and caused $25 million in damages to crops, homes and infrastructure
- 1964 – struck Vietnam.
- 1967 – struck Philippines and China.
- 1970 – killed 915 people in the Philippines.
- 1973 – struck South China.
- 1976 – briefly threatened Hawaii.
- 1985 – Category 3 hurricane, grazed Cuba, directly struck Panama City, Florida.
- 1999 – effect on the Philippines.
- 2003 – Category 3 hurricane, brushed Newfoundland.
- 2006 – short-lived Category 2 cyclone in the northwestern Coral Sea, not a threat to land.
- 2014 – severe Category 4 cyclone that moved from the South-East Indian Ocean basin into the South-West Indian Ocean basin, not a threat to land.
- 2015 – Category 1 hurricane, brushed the Bahamas.
- 2021 – weak and disorganized tropical storm which stayed at sea.

- Katherine

- 1963 – a weak tropical storm that made landfall in Southern California.
- 1973 – did not make landfall.

- Kathleen

- 1947 – Affected Kantō, Japan.
- 1961 – not a threat to land.
- 1965 – passed southeast of Rodrigues on February 16, generating high waves that reached 3.5 m (11 ft) along the island's southern coast.
- 1968 – not a threat to land.
- 1972 – came close to land.
- 1976 – Category 1 hurricane, made landfall in Baja as a tropical storm, moved into California and Arizona.

- Kathy

- 1954 – a Category 2 typhoon that made landfall Japan.
- 1958 – a Category 3 typhoon that affected Philippines.
- 1961 – a Category 1 typhoon that minimal affected Japan.
- 1964 – the largest and longest-lived typhoon of the season.
- 1966 – a Category 3 typhoon that stayed at sea for its whole life.
- 1969 – remained at sea while paralleling the coasts of the Philippines and Japan.
- 1970 – moved over the open ocean; was re-designated as Tropical Cyclone Michelle upon crossing into the South-West Indian Ocean basin.
- 1972 – remained over the open ocean.
- 1976 – a Category 1 typhoon that stayed at sea for its whole life.
- 1984† – Category 5 severe tropical cyclone, devastated the Sir Edward Pellew Group of Islands.

- Katia

- 1970 – a weak tropical storm that approached Madagascar but did not make it to the island.
- 2011 – powerful Category 4 hurricane that affected Europe as a post-tropical cyclone.
- 2017 – small Category 2 hurricane that struck Tecolutla, Mexico as a weak Category 1 storm.
- 2023 – formed in the eastern tropical Atlantic and stayed at sea.

- Katie

- 1955 – made landfall in Hispaniola as a Category 2 hurricane.
- 1964 – a strong tropical cyclone that caused minor damage to the Northern Territory.
- 2015 – unofficially named by researchers, was an unusual weather event in early 2015.

- Katrina

- 1967 – struck Baja California and caused flooding in the southwest U.S. as a tropical storm.
- 1971 – affected Baja California and hit Mexico as a tropical storm.
- 1975 – did not affect land.
- 1981 – late-season Category 1 hurricane that impacted portions of the Greater Antilles and Bahamas.
- 1998† – severe and erratic tropical cyclone that affected the Solomon Islands, Vanuatu, and Northern Australia. Its remnants eventually regenerated into Cyclone Victor–Cindy.
- 1999 – Disorganized and weak tropical storm that caused minor damage in Central America and Mexico.
- 2005† – A powerful Category 5 major hurricane that devastated the U.S. Gulf Coast, making landfall first near Miami, Florida, as a Category 1 hurricane, near Buras, Louisiana and Long Beach, Mississippi, at Category 3 intensity, causing over US$125 billion in damage and over 1,800 deaths.

- Katring

- 1983 – which struck the Philippines and China.
- 1987† – which struck South Korea as a Category 1 typhoon.
- 1994 – which struck the Philippines and Vietnam.
- 2006 – did not make landfall.
- 2010† – the first typhoon to impact Japan since Typhoon Melor in October 2009.

- Kay

- 1966 – a strong tropical cyclone mostly stayed at sea.
- 1980 – a powerful Category 4 hurricane, fifth longest duration in the Pacific Basin, remained mostly at sea.
- 1986 – did not make landfall.
- 1987 – a category 2 tropical cyclone (Australian scale) impacted Papua New Guinea and Western Australia.
- 1992 – did not make landfall.
- 1998 – a Category 1 hurricane mostly stayed at sea.
- 2004 – did not make landfall.
- 2016 – did not make landfall.
- 2022 – a Category 2 hurricane that made landfall in Baja California as a tropical storm.

- Kayang

- 1964 – a tropical storm that made landfall in the Philippines and Vietnam.
- 1976 – A tropical depression formed near the coast of the Philippines and dissipated the following day.
- 1980 – the tropical depression that affected the Mariana Islands.

- Keila (2011) – was the first named storm of the 2011 North Indian Ocean cyclone season.
- Keith

- 1977 – Category 1 tropical cyclone (Australian scale) impact Queensland.
- 1988 – affected Central America and Florida, causing $7.3 million in damages.
- 1997 – a super typhoon which affected Guam and the Northern Mariana Islands, causing $15 million in damages.
- 2000† – a Category 4 hurricane that caused extensive damage in Central America, particularly in Belize and Mexico.

- Keli

- 1984 – remained over open waters.
- 1986 – a category 1 tropical cyclone (Australian scale) minimal affected Vanuatu.
- 1996† – the first recorded post-season tropical cyclone to form in June within the South Pacific Ocean.
- 2025 – a weak, short-lived storm that tracked south of the island of Hawaii.

- Kelly

- 1981 – a weak but destructive tropical storm that struck the Philippines.
- 1984 – never threatened land.
- 1987 – a Category 2 typhoon that struck Japan.
- 1997 – a weak tropical storm mostly stayed at sea.

- Kelvin

- 1991 – a Category 2 tropical cyclone that did not affect land.
- 2018 – a strong tropical cyclone that impacted Western Australia causing moderate damage.

- Ken

- 1979 – struck Japan.
- 1982 – struck Japan
- 1983 – storm briefly reached Category 3 status before making landfall in the sparsely populated area.
- 1986 – a category 2 typhoon mostly stayed at sea.
- 1989 – synonymous with that season's Lola (one storm with two names, thought to have been separate due to difficulties in tracking poorly organized systems); hit eastern China.
- 1992 – stayed at sea.
- 2004 – a tropical low that affected Western Australia.
- 2009 – stayed at sea.

- Kenanga (2018) – a Category 4 tropical cyclone that did not affect land.
- Kendra

- 1966 – an eastern Atlantic October storm that was operationally declared a tropical storm but later determined to have not even been a tropical cyclone and was removed from the official records.
- 1978 – not a threat to land.

- Keni (2018)† – a Category 3 severe tropical cyclone that impacted Fiji.
- Kenna

- 1984 – remained well out at sea.
- 1990 – a Category 1 hurricane that did not affect land.
- 2002† – a Category 5 hurricane that made landfall near San Blas, Mexico.

- Kenneth

- 1993 – Category 4 hurricane that did not affect land.
- 2005 – Category 4 hurricane whose remnants brought heavy rainfall to Hawaii.
- 2011 – Category 4 hurricane that did not affect land.
- 2017 – Category 4 hurricane that did not affect land.
- 2019 – Category 4 equivalent tropical cyclone that made landfall in Mozambique.
- 2023 – weak tropical storm that stayed at sea.

- Kent

- 1992 – struck Japan.
- 1995 – made landfall on China near Hong Kong.

- Kerry

- 1973 – a Category 4 severe tropical cyclone that made landfall Western Australia.
- 1979† – a Category 4 severe tropical cyclone that affected Solomon Islands and Queensland.
- 1989 – remained away from ocean.
- 2005 – a Category 3 severe tropical cyclone that affected Vanuatu.

- Kesiny (2002) – was the first recorded tropical cyclone – the equivalent of a minimal hurricane – to make landfall in the month of May in the south-west Indian Ocean.
- Ketsana

- 2003 – remained over the open ocean.
- 2009† – struck the Philippines and causing massive flooding in Metro Manila and other provinces nearby.

- Kevin

- 1979 – off-season system that took an unusual zig-zag path.
- 1985 – stayed in the open ocean.
- 1991 – a Category 4 hurricane that caused no damage or casualties.
- 1997 – did not make landfall.
- 2003 – a weak tropical storm that paralleled the Baja California peninsula.
- 2009 – churned in open ocean.
- 2015 – did not impact land.
- 2021 – paralleled the west coast of Mexico.
- 2023† – a Category 5 severe tropical cyclone that made landfall in Vanuatu.

- Kezia (1950) – a Category 3 typhoon great damage in Western Japan.
- Khai-Muk (2008) – made landfall in Andhra Pradesh.
- Khanun

- 2005 – the strongest tropical cyclone to make landfall on Zhejiang Province since Wanda in 1956.
- 2012 – the first tropical cyclone to directly impact Korea in two years.
- 2017 – a mid-range Category 2 typhoon that affected Hainan as a weak tropical storm.
- 2023 – a category 4 typhoon which lingered the Okinawa Islands, and eventually struck Korea.

- Kiyapo (2026) – a Category 2 typhoon that struck Luzon and Guangdong.
- Kiko

- 1983 – paralleled the Mexican coastline.
- 1989 – struck Baja California causing minor damage.
- 2001 (September) – struck Ryukyu Islands, Taiwan and China.
- 2001 (September) – stayed in the open ocean.
- 2005 – struck China
- 2007 – killed 15 people in Mexico without ever making landfall.
- 2009 – a 2009 storm that struck Ryukyu Islands, Taiwan and China
- 2013 (August) – never threatened land.
- 2013 (August) – a storm that made landfall in Vietnam during August 7 and 8, 2013.
- 2017 – make landfall over Pingtan County of Fujian in China.
- 2019 – long-lived tropical cyclone that stayed in the open ocean.
- 2021 - a very powerful tropical cyclone which impacted the Philippines.
- 2025 (August) – a Category 4 hurricane passed north of Hawaii.
- 2025 (September) – a weak tropical storm that brushed the southern and eastern coasts of Japan.

- Kilo (2015) – a long-lived tropical cyclone that traveled more than 4,000 miles (6,400 kilometers) from its formation point southeast of the Hawaiian Islands to its dissipation point northeast of Japan.
- Kim

- 1965 – strong tropical storm which stayed offshore Japan.
- 1968 – relatively strong typhoon which recurved at sea.
- 1971 – affected the Philippines and Vietnam
- 1974 – strong tropical storm which did not affect any landmass.
- 1975 – lingered over the Northern Territory and Far North Queensland in early-December 1975.
- 1977 – late-season typhoon which struck the Philippines, killing 102
- 1980 – struck the Philippines and China.
- 1983 – struck Vietnam and Thailand, reportedly causing more than 300 fatalities
- 1986 – late-season strong typhoon which did not affect land areas.
- 2000† – strong tropical cyclone which only caused minor damage in French Polynesia.

- Kimi (2021) – a small tropical cyclone which briefly threatened the Eastern Coast of North Queensland.
- Kina

- 1982 – a minimal tropical cyclone which slightly affected Vanuatu and Fiji, causing moderate damage.
- 1992† – a severe tropical cyclone that greatly affected Fiji and Tonga, claiming 26 lives and causing $110 million worth of damage.

- King (1950) – was the most severe hurricane to strike the city of Miami, Florida since the 1926 Miami hurricane.
- Kinna

- 1991 – a relatively strong mid-season typhoon which struck western Japan, killing 11.
- 1994 – another typhoon which affected Japan, but did not make landfall.

- Kirk

- 1996 – a strong typhoon which struck Japan, causing 4 deaths and moderate damage.
- 2012 – a Category 2 hurricane that stayed in the open ocean.
- 2018 – a strong tropical storm the second lowest-latitude on record in the Atlantic basin: affected Lesser Antilles.
- 2024 – Category 4 major hurricane that churned in the open ocean; remnants affected Europe.

- Kirogi

- 2000 – passed close to Japan while weakening.
- 2005 – not a threat to land.
- 2012 – no make landfall.
- 2017 – a weak tropical cyclone that affected the Philippines and Vietnam.
- 2023 – remained away from ocean.

- Kirrily

- 1989 – a strong tropical cyclone that never affected land.
- 2000 – a strong tropical cyclone that never affected land.
- 2009 – a Category 1 tropical cyclone that made landfall over Aru Islands.
- 2024† – a Category 3 severe tropical cyclone that made landfall over Queensland.

- Kirsty

- 1973 – did not make landfall.
- 1985 – although powerful, tropical cyclone failed to make landfall.
- 1996† – a strong tropical cyclone crossed the coast at Pardoo Station near Port Hedland, the cyclone did considerable damage to tourist cabins and other structures.

- Kit

- 1953 – a Category 5 super typhoon which hit Taiwan, East China and North Korea.
- 1957 – another Category 5 typhoon that struck the Philippines during the 1957 elections, causing 19 deaths.
- 1960 – a large typhoon which struck the Philippines, South China and northern Vietnam, resulting to at least 149 fatalities.
- 1963 – a category 4 super typhoon.
- 1966 – one of the most intense typhoons recorded in the Western Pacific; struck Japan and killed 64.
- 1968 – a minimal typhoon which affected no land areas.
- 1972 – an unusually strong early-season typhoon that devastated central and southern Philippines in early-January 1972, claiming at least 204 lives.
- 1974 – hitting the Philippines, the system weakened to a tropical depression.
- 1978 – a severe tropical storm.
- 1981 – strong, late-season typhoon which affected Mindanao as a remnant low.
- 1985 – a long-lived and erratic typhoon that skirted southwestern Japan before hitting South Korea, leading to the loss of 12 lives.
- 1988 – a severe tropical storm which made landfall on the extreme northern tip of Luzon Island and then Hong Kong.

- Kitty

- 1949 – struck Japan after Typhoon Judith.
- 1971 – struck Rodrigues, causing power outages.
- 1973 – tropical disturbance that affected the Northern Territory.

- Klaring

- 1966 – struck the Philippines, killing 174 people along its path.
- 1970 – made landfall in the Philippines.
- 1974 – had no significant impacts on land.
- 1978 – struck Taiwan as a tropical depression.
- 1982 – a Category 3 typhoon that curved away from the Philippines.
- 1986 – meandered around the basin.
- 1990 – a Category 4 typhoon that struck the Philippines and made landfall in China.
- 1994 – had the largest average forecast errors out of all the typhoons in 1994.
- 1998 – killed one person in Hong Kong after landfall near there.

- Klaus

- 2009 – caused substantial damage in Spain and France with at least 23 fatalities reported.
- 1984 – formed in the eastern Caribbean Sea, caused damage in the Leeward and Virgin Islands.
- 1990† – was a minimal Atlantic hurricane that dropped heavy rainfall across the Lesser Antilles in October 1990.

- Knut

- 1981 – tropical storm that hit the coast of Mexico.
- 1987† – a weak tropical storm was mostly at sea.

- Kofi (2014) – a Category 2 tropical cyclone approached Tonga causing sea flooding but no major damage.
- Koguma

- 2021 – a weak tropical cyclone that made landfall in Vietnam, causing minor damage.
- 2026 – a Category 4 typhoon that remained in the open ocean.

- Koinu (2023) – a strong and damaging tropical cyclone that made landfall on the southern tip of Taiwan and affected Hong Kong.
- Koji

- 2012 – stayed at sea and was the last cyclone to be renamed.
- 2026 – a Category 2 tropical cyclone that made landfall in the Queensland.

- Kompasu

- 2004 – Struck Hong Kong.
- 2010 – Skirted Okinawa before making landfall in Seoul, South Korea.
- 2016 – struck Japan.
- 2021† – a very large and deadly tropical cyclone that affected the Philippines, Taiwan, and southeast China.

- Kong-rey

- 2001 – not make landfall.
- 2007 – a moderate typhoon that affected Guam and the Northern Mariana Islands in early April 2007.
- 2013 – a tropical storm that affected Japan passed off the coast of China and South Korea and came to the coast of Japan as a depression.
- 2018 – a Category 5 super typhoon that affected Japan and South Korea.
- 2024† – a large Category 4 super typhoon that made landfall in Taiwan.

- Konsing

- 1964 – made landfall on southern China.
- 1968 – did not impact land significantly.
- 1972 – a typhoon that struck the Philippines and southern China, causing 131 deaths.
- 1976 – affected the Philippines, but did not make landfall and mostly stayed to sea.
- 1980 – affected the Philippines.
- 1984 – struck southern China.
- 1988 – was not analyzed as a tropical storm by the JTWC.
- 1992 – moved over the Philippines and made landfall on Hainan as a Category 1 typhoon, causing 4 deaths.
- 1996 – a Category 4 typhoon that curved away from the Philippines.
- 2000 – a tropical depression that affected the Philippines and Taiwan.

- Koppu

- 2013 – not make landfall.
- 2009 – a typhoon struck China in September 2009.
- 2015† – a powerful and devastating tropical cyclone that struck Luzon in October 2015.

- Koryn

- 1990 – not make landfall.
- 1993 – struck the Philippines and China.

- Koto (2025) – a fairly strong and erratic tropical cyclone that impacted much of the Visayas and portions of Luzon and Mindanao in the Philippines.
- Krathon (2024)† – a powerful tropical cyclone that struck the Philippines and the made landfall in Taiwan.
- Krising

- 1971 – a system which made landfall in Luzon twice in October after executing a loop.
- 1979 – a late-season tropical storm which struck the Philippines.
- 1983 – a late-season system which stayed at sea.

- Kristen

- 1966 – the eighth tropical cyclone of the 1966 and the second to make landfall in the Baja California peninsula.
- 1970 – a weak tropical storm causing squalls near the Mexican coast.
- 1974 – not make landfall.

- Kristine

- 2020 – powerful category 4 typhoon that affected Japan and the Korean Peninsula.
- 2024† – a deadly high-end tropical storm which affected the Philippines, Vietnam and Thailand.

- Kristy

- 1971 – a weak tropical storm that stayed at sea, dissipated near the Azores.
- 1978 – a Category 2 hurricane that reached the Central Pacific before dissipating.
- 1982 – a Category 1 hurricane that dissipated southwest of Hawaii.
- 1988 – Category 1 hurricane, moved parallel to the coast of Mexico while remaining offshore.
- 1994 – Category 2 hurricane that passed to the south of the Hawaiian islands.
- 2000 – weak and short-lived storm that formed at sea.
- 2006 – small Category 1 hurricane that remained at sea.
- 2012 – moved parallel to Mexico without causing damage.
- 2018 – strong tropical storm, formed in the open ocean.
- 2024 – a Category 5 hurricane that stayed at sea.

- Krosa

- 2001 – a storm that never affected land.
- 2007 – struck Taiwan and China.
- 2013 – struck the Philippines and affected Vietnam.
- 2019 — struck Japan as a tropical storm.
- 2025 – a storm that minimal affected in the Japan.

- Krovanh

- 2003 – struck the Philippines and China.
- 2009 – a tropical storm that passed off the coast of Japan.
- 2015 – stayed at sea.
- 2020 – a tropical storm which caused deadly flooding in the Philippines.
- 2026 – a weak tropical storm that struck in Japan.

- Kuena (2012) – remained over the open ocean.
- Kujira

- 2003 – threatened the Philippines and Taiwan before approaching Japan.
- 2009 – affected the Philippines before turning out to sea.
- 2015 – formed in the South China Sea.
- 2020 – stayed at sea.
- 2026 – had an erratic track causing minor impacts in Northern Luzon, the first storm to have 2 PAGASA names since Maysak in 2008.

- Kulap

- 2005 – remained over the open ocean.
- 2011 – passed through the Ryukyu Islands.
- 2017 – remained over the open ocean.
- 2022 – remained over the open ocean.

- Kuring

- 1965 – was analyzed as a tropical storm by the JTWC.
- 1969 – made landfall in Vietnam as a tropical storm.
- 1973 – affected the Philippines and Taiwan.
- 1977 – affected China.
- 1981 – made landfall in Taiwan and Japan.
- 1985 – struck the Philippines and made landfall in China, causing 53 deaths with 3 missing.
- 1989 – made landfall in the Philippines, Hainan, and Vietnam; 8 people were killed with 1 missing.
- 1993 – made landfall on Mindanao.
- 1997 – made landfall in Japan, killing 3.

- Kurumí (2020)† – a subtropical storm that brought heavy rainfall to the southeastern region of Brazil that caused widespread flooding and landslides.
- Kyant (2016) – was last noted as a well-marked low-pressure area off the coast of southern Andhra Pradesh.
- Kyarr (2019) – was an extremely powerful tropical cyclone that became the first super cyclonic storm in the North Indian Ocean since Gonu in 2007.
- Kyle

- 1990 – stayed at sea.
- 1993 – struck the Philippines and Vietnam.
- 1996 – formed in the western Caribbean and made landfall over Guatemala and Honduras as a weakening storm, causing no significant damage.
- 2002 – long-lived hurricane, bobbed in and out of the Carolinas, causing $5 million damage, mostly from tornadoes.
- 2008 – formed north of Hispaniola and made landfall in Nova Scotia as a minimal hurricane.
- 2020 – earliest eleventh named storm on record, formed off the coast of New Jersey and dissipated out in the ocean.

== See also ==
- European windstorm names
- Atlantic hurricane season
- Pacific hurricane season
- Tropical cyclone naming
- South Atlantic tropical cyclone
- Tropical cyclone
