= Labuyo (disambiguation) =

Labuyo may refer to:

- Siling labuyo, a type of chili pepper found in the Philippines
- Sili ice cream, also called Labuyo ice cream, is a type of ice cream using Siling labuyo
- List of storms named Labuyo, list of four tropical cyclones by the same name
  - Typhoon Labuyo, a 2013 typhoon, that struck the Philippines and southern China
