= List of storms named Kelly =

The name Kelly has been used for four tropical cyclones in the Western Pacific Ocean.

- Tropical Storm Kelly (1981) (T8106, 04W, Daling) – struck the Philippines causing significant damage
- Typhoon Kelly (1984) (T8415, 15W) – never threatened land
- Typhoon Kelly (1987) (T8721, 20W, Oniang) – struck Japan
- Tropical Storm Kelly (1997) (T9703, 04W) – a weak tropical storm that mostly stayed at sea
