= List of storms named Champi =

The name Champi (Lao: ຈຳປີ, [t͡ɕam˩ piː˩]) has been used for three tropical cyclones in the Western Pacific Ocean. The name was contributed by Laos and refers to the white champaca (Magnolia × alba) or plumeria (Plumeria rubra) in Lao. It replaced the name Ketsana, which was retired following the 2009 Pacific typhoon season.

- Typhoon Champi (2015) (T1525, 25W) – a Category 4 typhoon that remained over the open ocean.
- Typhoon Champi (2021) (T2105, 06W) – a Category 1 typhoon that churned in the open ocean.
- Typhoon Champi (2026) (T2630, 29W, Rosal) – an extremely powerful Category 5 super typhoon that caused damage in the Mariana Islands, Taiwan, and Japan.

Preceded by Koguma	Pacific typhoon season names Champi	Succeeded by In-fa
