= List of storms named Klaring =

The name Klaring has been used to name nine tropical cyclones in the Philippine Area of Responsibility in the West Pacific Ocean:

- Typhoon Irma (1966) (T6602, 02W, Klaring) – a Category 4-equivalent typhoon that killed 174 people in the Philippines.
- Tropical Storm Pamela (1970) (T7004, 03W, Klaring) – a severe tropical storm that made landfall in the Philippines.
- Tropical Storm Emma (1974) (T7406, 06W, Klaring) – a severe tropical storm.
- Tropical Storm Rose (1978) (T7804, 04W, Klaring) – affected Taiwan.
- Typhoon Pat (1982) (T8204, 04W, Klaring) – a Category 3-equivalent typhoon.
- Tropical Storm Mac (1986) (T8604, 04W, Klaring) – moved generally to the east-northeast.
- Typhoon Percy (1990) (T9006, 07W, Klaring) – a Category 4-equivalent typhoon that became the second tropical cyclone to affect the Philippines in one week.
- Typhoon Page (1994) (T9402, 03W, Klaring) – a Category 2-equivalent typhoon that had the largest average forecast errors out of all the typhoons in 1994.
- Tropical Storm Penny (1998) (T9803, 05W, Klaring) – a severe tropical storm.
