= List of storms named Lannie =

The name Lannie has been used for three tropical cyclones in the Philippine Area of Responsibility in the West Pacific Ocean, replacing Labuyo on the naming lists:

- Typhoon Talim (2017) (T1718, 20W, Lannie) – a Category 4-equivalent typhoon that made landfall in Japan, causing five fatalities.
- Tropical Storm Lionrock (2021) (T2117, 22W, Lannie) – caused eight fatalities across the Philippines, Hong Kong, and Vietnam.
- Severe Tropical Storm Tapah (2025) (T2516, 22W, Lannie) – a severe tropical storm that affected Hong Kong, Macau, and South China.

== See also ==
- Hurricane Lenny (1999) – an Atlantic hurricane with a similar name.

Preceded by Kiko	Pacific typhoon season names Lannie	Succeeded by Magyawan
