= List of storms named Koji =

The name Koji has been used for two tropical cyclones in the Australian region:

- Cyclone Koji (2012) – stayed at sea and was renamed Cyclone Joni by RSMC La Réunion.
- Cyclone Koji (2026) – a Category 2 tropical cyclone that affected North Queensland.

== See also ==
- Cyclone Kofi (2014) – a South Pacific Ocean tropical cyclone with a similar name.
