= List of storms named Konsing =

The name Konsing has been used for ten tropical cyclones in the Philippine Area of Responsibility in the West Pacific Ocean:

- Typhoon Viola (1964) (T6402, 03W, Konsing) – made landfall on southern China.
- Typhoon Lucy (1968) (T6803, 06W, Konsing) – did not impact land significantly.
- Typhoon Ora (1972) (T7205, 06W, Konsing) – a typhoon that struck the Philippines and southern China, causing 131 deaths.
- Typhoon Marie (1976) (T7603, 03W, Konsing) – affected the Philippines, but did not make landfall and mostly stayed to sea.
- Tropical Depression Konsing (1980) – affected the Philippines.
- Tropical Storm Betty (1984) (T8404, 04W, Konsing) – struck southern China.
- Tropical Storm 03W (1988) (03W, Konsing) – was not analyzed as a tropical storm by the JTWC.
- Typhoon Eli (1992; T9205, 05W, Konsing) – moved over the Philippines and made landfall on Hainan as a Category 1 typhoon, causing 4 deaths.
- Typhoon Bart (1996) (T9603, 04W, Konsing) – a Category 4 typhoon that curved away from the Philippines.
- Tropical Depression 03W (2000) (03W, Konsing) – a tropical depression that affected the Philippines and Taiwan.
