= List of storms named Parma =

The name Parma has been used for two tropical cyclones in the western North Pacific Ocean. The name was contributed by Macau and refers to Prosciutto di Parma, thinly-sliced ham often with livers and mushrooms in Macanese cuisine.

- Typhoon Parma (2003) (T0318, 21W) – an erratic and long lived super typhoon that remained over the open ocean; interacted with Typhoon Ketsana.
- Typhoon Parma (2009) (T0917, 19W, Pepeng) – another erratic super typhoon that stalled at the Northern Philippines, made landfall on the island of Hainan, China, and then in Vietnam, causing 500 fatalities; interacted with Typhoon Melor.

The name Parma was retired following the 2009 Pacific typhoon season and was replaced with In-fa.
