= List of storms named Kinna =

The name Kinna was used for two tropical cyclones in the Northwestern Pacific Ocean:

- Typhoon Kinna (1991) (T9117, 19W, Neneng) – a relatively strong mid-season typhoon which struck western Japan, killing 11.
- Typhoon Kinna (1994) (T9421, 24W) – another typhoon which affected Japan, but did not make landfall.
