= List of storms named In-fa =

The name In-fa (Cantonese: 煙花, [jiːn˥ faː˥]) has been used for three tropical cyclones in the West Pacific Ocean. The name was contributed by Macau and means fireworks in Cantonese. In-fa replaced Parma following the 2009 Pacific typhoon season.

- Typhoon In-fa (2015) (T1526, 27W, Marilyn) – Category 4 typhoon, churned in the open ocean
- Typhoon In-fa (2021) (T2106, 09W, Fabian) – Category 2 typhoon, made landfalls in the Putuo District of Zhoushan and Pinghu, China
- Typhoon In-fa (2026) (T2631, 30W) – a Category 4 super typhoon that impacted the Mariana Islands and Pacific Coast of Honshu.

Preceded by Champi	Pacific typhoon season names In-fa	Succeeded by Cempaka
