= List of storms named Ketsana =

The name Ketsana (Lao: ເກດສະໜາ, [keːt̚˧˩ sa naː˩]) has been used for two tropical cyclones in the western North Pacific Ocean. The name was contributed by Laos and means agarwood (Aquilaria crassna) in Lao.

- Typhoon Ketsana (2003) (T0317, 20W, Tisoy) – remained over the open ocean.
- Typhoon Ketsana (2009) (T0916, 17W, Ondoy) – struck the Philippines and causing massive flooding in Metro Manila and other provinces nearby, later made landfall in Vietnam as a Category 2 typhoon.

The name Ketsana was retired following the 2009 Pacific typhoon season and was replaced with Champi.
