= List of storms named Ken =

The name Ken has been used for four tropical cyclones in the West Pacific Ocean and four in the Australian region.

In the West Pacific:

- Tropical Storm Ken (1979) (T7912, 15W, Oniang) – struck Japan.
- Typhoon Ken (1982) (T8219, 20W, Tering) – struck Japan.
- Typhoon Ken (1986) (T8602, 02W)
- Tropical Storm Ken-Lola (1989) (T8912, 13W / 14W) – one storm with two names, operationally thought to have been separate due to difficulties in tracking poorly organized systems; hit eastern China.

In the Australian region:

- Cyclone Ken (1983)
- Cyclone Ken (1992)
- Tropical Low Ken (2004)
- Cyclone Ken (2009)

== See also ==
- Cyclone Keni (2018) – a South Pacific tropical cyclone with a similar name.
