= List of storms named Kadiang =

The name Kadiang has been used to name two tropical cyclones in the Philippine Area of Responsibility in the West Pacific Ocean:

- Typhoon Kit (1981) (T8128, 28W, Kadiang) – strong, late-season typhoon which affected Mindanao as a remnant low.
- Typhoon Flo (1993) (T9320, 26W, Kadiang) – a minimal but erratic typhoon which devastated the Philippines and killed at least 500 people due to flooding.
