= List of storms named Kayang =

The name Kayang has been used to name four tropical cyclones in the Philippine Area of Responsibility in the West Pacific Ocean:

- Tropical Storm Billie (1964) (T6422, 34W, Kayang) – a tropical storm that made landfall in the Philippines and Vietnam.
- Tropical Depression Kayang (1976) – A tropical depression formed near the coast of the Philippines and dissipated the following day.
- Tropical Depression Kayang (1980) – the tropical depression that affected the Mariana Islands
