= List of storms named Kara =

The name Kara was used for two tropical cyclones worldwide.

In the Atlantic Ocean:

- Hurricane Kara (1969) – Category 2 hurricane, brought storm surge and flooding to coastal North Carolina while moving offshore.

In the Australian region of the south-east Indian Ocean:

- Cyclone Kara (2007) – Category 3 severe tropical cyclone, formed off the Kimberley coast.
