= List of storms named Karing =

The name Karing has been used to name eight tropical cyclones in the Philippine Area of Responsibility in the West Pacific Ocean:

- Typhoon Shirley (1963) (T6304, 07W, Karing) – a Category 5-equivalent super typhoon.
- Typhoon Violet (1967) (T6704, 04W, Karing) – a Category 4-equivalent typhoon that affected Luzon.
- Typhoon Vera (1971) (T7103, 03W, Karing) – a Category 2-equivalent typhoon.
- Tropical Depression 05W (1975) (05W, Karing) – affected Taiwan.
- Tropical Storm Dot (1979) (T7904, 04W, Karing) – affected the Philippines.
- Typhoon Walt (1991) (T9104, 04W, Karing) – a Category 5 super typhoon.
- Tropical Storm Helen (1995) (T9505, 08W, Karing) – a severe tropical storm that made landfall near Hong Kong, causing 23 fatalities.
- Tropical Depression Jacob (1999) (03W, Karing) – made landfall in southern Luzon.
