= Typhoon Khanun (2005) =

Pacific typhoon in 2005

Typhoon Khanun (Kiko)
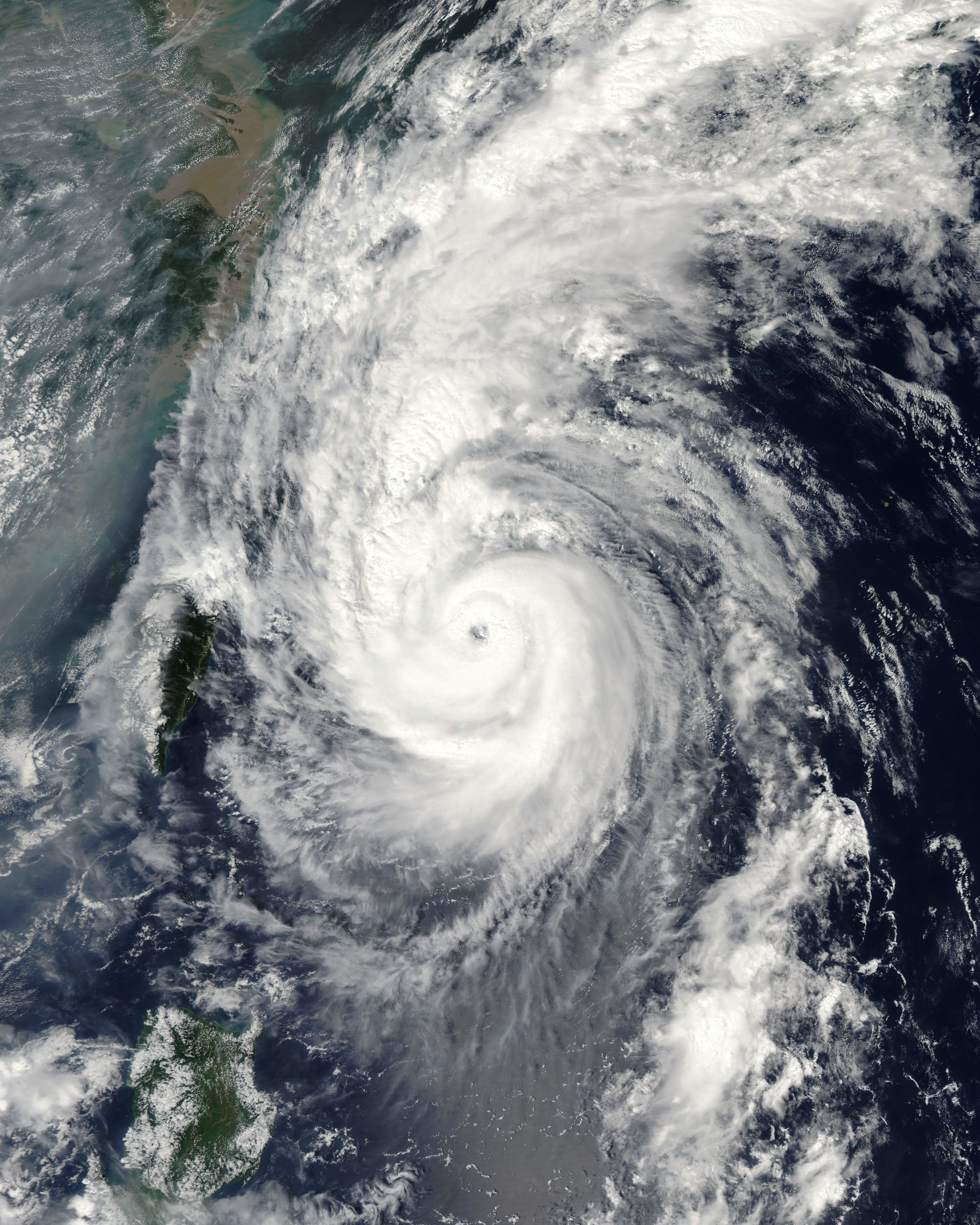
- Khanun prior to peak intensity approaching the Ryukyu Islands on September 11

Meteorological history
- Formed: September 5, 2005
- Extratropical: September 12, 2005
- Dissipated: September 13, 2005

Very strong typhoon
- 10-minute sustained (JMA)
- Highest winds: 155 km/h (100 mph)
- Lowest pressure: 945 hPa (mbar); 27.91 inHg

Category 4-equivalent typhoon
- 1-minute sustained (SSHWS/JTWC)
- Highest winds: 215 km/h (130 mph)
- Lowest pressure: 927 hPa (mbar); 27.37 inHg

Overall effects
- Fatalities: 16 total
- Damage: $1.22 billion (2005 USD)
- Areas affected: Taiwan; Japan; China
- IBTrACS
- Part of the 2005 Pacific typhoon season

Typhoon Khanun, (Note: The name Khanun (Thai: ขนุน, [kʰa˨˩ nun˩˩˦]) was contributed by Thailand and means jackfruit (Artocarpus heterophyllus) in Thai.) known in the Philippines as Typhoon Kiko, was the strongest tropical cyclone to make landfall on Zhejiang Province since Typhoon Wanda in 1956. Khanun developed from an area of convection east-southeast of Yap on September 5, thereafter tracking northwestward. The precursor reached tropical storm status on September 7 and typhoon intensity the next day. The tropical cyclone reached its peak intensity on September 10 with winds estimated at 155 km/h (100 mph) and a minimum barometric pressure of 945 mbar (hPa; 27.91 inHg). (Note: All maximum sustained wind values are sustained for ten minutes and rounded to the nearest five unless otherwise noted, following the standard set by the World Meteorological Organization.) After weakening slightly, Khanun moved ashore Zhejiang Province the next day, weakening further as it tracked over land. After recurving into the Yellow Sea on September 12, Khanun became extratropical; these remnants continued to track into the open North Pacific before they were last noted on September 16. (Note: All damage totals are in 2005 United States dollars unless otherwise noted.) (Note: All currencies are converted to United States Dollars using Oanada with an exchange rate set on September 11, 2005.)

== Meteorological history ==
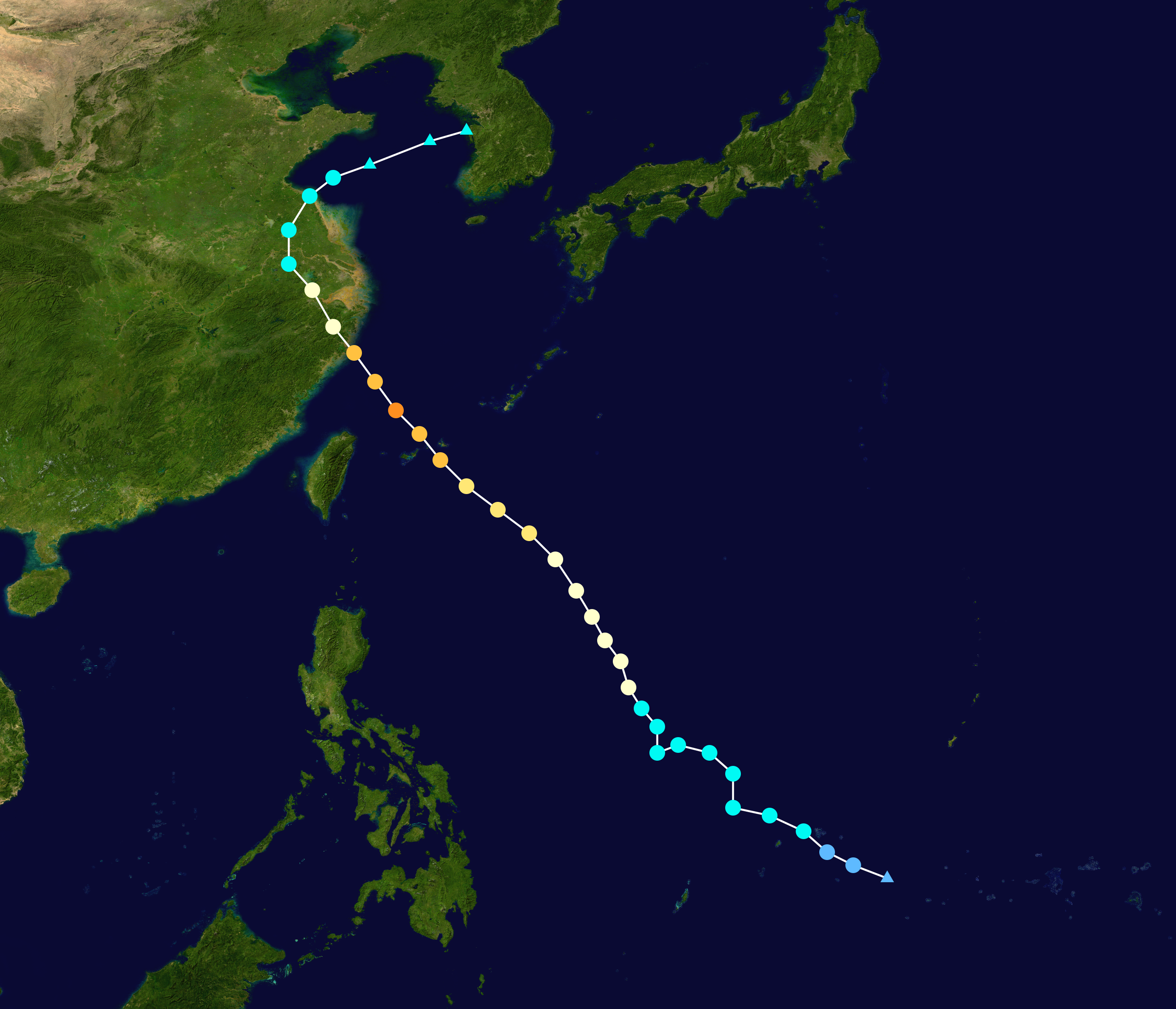
Map plotting the storm's track and intensity, according to the Saffir–Simpson scale Map key Saffir–Simpson scale Tropical depression (≤38 mph, ≤62 km/h) Tropical storm (39–73 mph, 63–118 km/h) Category 1 (74–95 mph, 119–153 km/h) Category 2 (96–110 mph, 154–177 km/h) Category 3 (111–129 mph, 178–208 km/h) Category 4 (130–156 mph, 209–251 km/h) Category 5 (≥157 mph, ≥252 km/h) Unknown Storm type Tropical cyclone Subtropical cyclone Extratropical cyclone, remnant low, tropical disturbance, or monsoon depression

Khanun arose from a persistent area of convection centered roughly 175 mi (280 km) east-southeast of Yap in early September. The Japan Meteorological Agency (JMA) designated the storm cluster as a tropical depression at 0000 UTC on September 5. The cyclone developed a favorable wind pattern that consolidated near its center. Tracking towards the northwest, the system intensified to tropical storm status east of the Philippines at 0000 UTC on September 7. As a result, the JMA named the system Khanun. Similarly, since the storm entered the area of responsibility of the Philippine Atmospheric, Geophysical and Astronomical Services Administration (PAGASA), the administration designated the tropical cyclone with the name Kiko.

With its trajectory determined primarily by a nearby ridge, Khanun gradually intensified, reaching typhoon intensity at 1800 UTC on September 8, southeast of Okinawa. Shortly after reaching the Ryukyu Islands and passing near Miyako-jima on September 10, the typhoon reached its peak intensity with maximum sustained winds of 155 km/h (100 mph) and a minimum barometric pressure of 945 mbar (hPa; 27.91 inHg) as estimated by the JMA. A slight northerly curve brought Khanun to a landfall in Zhejiang Province at 0600 UTC the next day At the time of landfall, the storm harbored sustained winds of 140 km/h (85 mph) Afterwards, Khanun quickly weakened, and was already downgraded to tropical storm status by the day's end. After making a curve northeastwards into the Yellow Sea, the JMA determined that the diffuse storm had fully transitioned into an extratropical cyclone on September 13, and shortly thereafter the JMA no longer monitored the system as a cohesive cyclone. The resultant vortex tracked rapidly across the Sea of Japan before reentering the northwestern Pacific Ocean; it was last noted over open waters on September 16.

== Preparations and impact ==
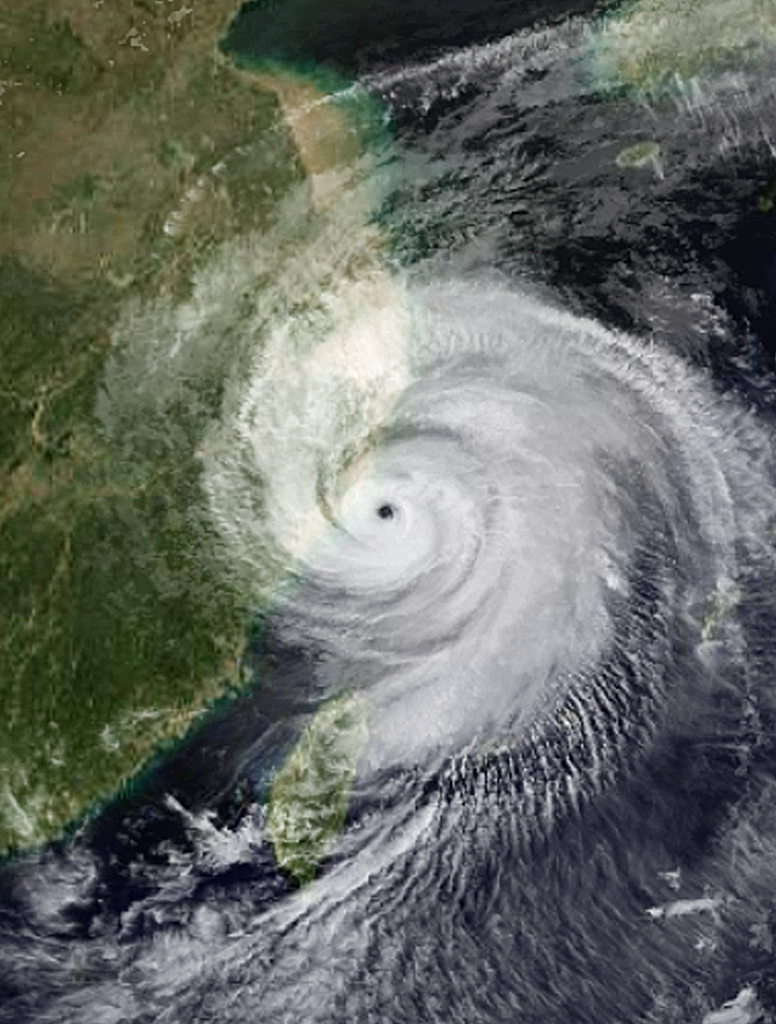
Typhoon Khanun near landfall in China on September 11

=== Japan ===
As Khanun approached the Ryukyu Islands, Japan Airlines and All Nippon Airways cancelled at least 70 flights combined linking those islands to other locations in Japan. The impending typhoon also forced scheduling changes in the running of ongoing election processes on Ishigaki Island. As the cyclone moved through the islands, moderate rain was documented. Precipitation peaked at 149 mm (5.9 in) in Nakasuji, Okinawa; the same station also recorded a peak 36 mm (1.4 in) in a single hour. In the Okinawa Prefecture, the winds and rain caused one injury and damaged 173 power lines. These felled lines resulted in widespread power outages. Damage to crops there totaled ¥150 million (US$1.4 million). The storm's impacts forced the cancellation of flights in addition to shipping routes between Okinawa Island and the Sakishima Islands. Further north in Aomori Prefecture, flights were also suspended. Heavy rains caused 31 landslides and caused flooding. Eleven homes were inundated by these floodwaters, and an additional 1,000 residences were impacted by power outages resulting from wind damage.

=== China ===
The city of Taizhou, Zhejiang bore the initial brunt of the storm as it was close to where the storm made landfall, 220 km south of Shanghai. Other coastal cities braced for the typhoon as it headed north. At least 14 people were killed and 1 went missing in Zhejiang province. Damages totaled to $849 million (2005 USD).

== See also ==
- Other tropical cyclones named Khanun
- Other tropical cyclones named Kiko
- Typhoon Fred (1994)
- Typhoon Rananim
- Typhoon Winnie (1997)
