= List of storms named Kelvin =

The name Kelvin has been used for two tropical cyclones in the Australian region:

- Cyclone Kelvin (1991) – a Category 2 tropical cyclone that did not affect land.
- Cyclone Kelvin (2018) – a strong tropical cyclone that impacted Western Australia, causing moderate damage.
