= List of storms named Kiko =

The name Kiko has been used for fourteen tropical cyclones worldwide, seven in the Eastern Pacific Ocean, and seven in the Philippine Area of Responsibility by PAGASA in the Western Pacific Ocean.

In the Eastern Pacific:

- Hurricane Kiko (1983) – Category 4 hurricane that paralleled the Mexican coastline
- Hurricane Kiko (1989) – Category 3 hurricane that struck Baja California
- Hurricane Kiko (2001) – Category 1 hurricane that stayed in the open ocean
- Tropical Storm Kiko (2007) – a strong tropical storm which killed 15 people in Mexico without even making landfall
- Hurricane Kiko (2013) – Category 1 hurricane never threatened land
- Hurricane Kiko (2019) – long-lived Category 4 hurricane that stayed in the open ocean
- Hurricane Kiko (2025) – long-lived compact Category 4 hurricane that passed north of Hawaii; strongest storm of the 2025 season by sustained winds

In the Western Pacific:

- Typhoon Nari (2001) (T0116, 20W, Kiko) – An erratic typhoon that struck Ryukyu Islands, Taiwan and China
- Typhoon Khanun (2005) (T0515, 15W, Kiko) – A costly Category 4 typhoon that affected China
- Typhoon Morakot (2009) (T0908, 09W, Kiko) – A deadly typhoon that ravaged Taiwan and also affected the Ryukyu Islands and China
- Tropical Storm Mangkhut (2013) (T1310, 10W, Kiko) – A weak tropical storm that struck Vietnam
- Tropical Storm Guchol (2017) (T1717, 19W, Kiko) – A weak tropical storm which hit China
- Typhoon Chanthu (2021) (T2114, 19W, Kiko) – A powerful Category 5 super typhoon that brushed the Philippines and Taiwan.
- Tropical Storm Peipah (2025) (T2515, 21W, Kiko) – a weak tropical storm that made landfall in Japan.

== See also ==
- Tropical Storm Kika (2008), a similarly-named tropical cyclone which existed in the Central Pacific Ocean
- Hurricane Kilo (2015), a similarly-named tropical cyclone which existed in the Central and then Western Pacific Ocean

Preceded by Jacinto	Pacific typhoon season names Kiko	Succeeded by Lannie
