= List of storms named Kirsty =

The name Kirsty has been used for three tropical cyclones in the Australian region:

- Cyclone Kirsty (1973) – a Category 3 severe tropical cyclone.
- Cyclone Kirsty (1985) – a Category 5 severe tropical cyclone.
- Cyclone Kirsty (1996) – a Category 4 severe tropical cyclone that made landfall in Western Australia.
