= List of storms named Kina =

The name Kina was used for two tropical cyclones in the South Pacific Ocean:

- Cyclone Kina (1982) – a minimal tropical cyclone which slightly affected Vanuatu and Fiji, causing moderate damage.
- Cyclone Kina (1992) – a severe tropical cyclone that greatly affected Fiji and Tonga, claiming 26 lives and causing $110 million worth of damage.

The name Kina was retired after the 1992–93 season.

== See also ==
- Tropical Storm Kika (2008) – a Central Pacific tropical storm with a similar name.
