= List of storms named Karding =

The name Karding has been used for three tropical cyclones in the Philippine Area of Responsibility in the West Pacific Ocean, replacing Katring:

- Tropical Depression Karding (2014) (14W, Karding)
- Tropical Storm Yagi (2018) (T1814, 18W, Karding) – caused 1-in-50 year precipitation on Miyako Island and the first tornado outbreak in modern Chinese history.
- Typhoon Noru (2022) (T2216, 18W, Karding) – a Category 5-equivalent super typhoon that became the strongest typhoon to make landfall in the Philippines in 2022.

The name Karding was retired following the 2022 season, being replaced with Kiyapo. (Note: Kiyapo refers to Pistia in Tagalog. It is also named after a district in the city of Manila.) It was first used in 2026.

- Typhoon Noul (2026) (T2612, 11W, Kiyapo) – a Category 2-equivalent typhoon that made landfall in Northern Luzon before making another landfall in Southern China.

== See also ==
- Typhoon Kading (1978) – a Pacific typhoon with a similar name; internationally known as Typhoon Rita.
