= List of storms named Kuring =

The name Kuring has been used to name nine tropical cyclones in the Philippine Area of Responsibility in the West Pacific Ocean:

- Tropical Depression Thelma (1965) (04W, Kuring)
- Typhoon Tess (1969) (T6904, 04W, Kuring) – a Category 1-equivalent typhoon.
- Tropical Storm Fran (1973) (T7307, 07W, Kuring) – affected the Philippines.
- Tropical Storm Ruth (1977) (T7702, 03W, Kuring) – displaced thousands of people in the Philippines.
- Typhoon June (1981) (T8105, 05W, Kuring) – a Category 1-equivalent typhoon.
- Typhoon Hal (1985) (T8505, 05W, Kuring) – a Category 3-equivalent typhoon that caused 53 fatalities across the Philippines, Taiwan, and China.
- Typhoon Dot (1989) (T8905, 05W, Kuring) – a Category 3-equivalent typhoon that destroyed over 1,000 homes in Hainan.
- Tropical Depression 04W (1993) (04W, Kuring) – made landfall on Mindanao.
- Typhoon Opal (1997) (T9707, 08W, Kuring) – a Category 2-equivalent typhoon that affected Japan.
