= List of storms named Labuyo =

The name Labuyo has been used for four tropical cyclones in the Philippine Area of Responsibility by PAGASA in the Western Pacific Ocean. It means a type of chili pepper or red junglefowl (Gallus gallus) in Tagalog.

- Typhoon Lekima (2001) (T0119, 23W, Labuyo) – made landfall on Taiwan.
- Typhoon Damrey (2005) (T0518, 17W, Labuyo) – made landfall on Hainan, and later in Vietnam.
- Tropical Storm Dujuan (2009) (T0912, 13W, Labuyo) – remained out in the open ocean.
- Typhoon Utor (2013) (T1311, 11W, Labuyo) – powerful typhoon that made landfall on Luzon, in the Philippines, and later in Guangdong, China.

The name Labuyo was retired following the 2013 Pacific typhoon season and was replaced with Lannie.
