= List of storms named Kit =

The name Kit has been used for twelve tropical cyclones in the Western North Pacific Ocean.

- Typhoon Kit (1953) (T5304, 05W) – a Category 5-equivalent super typhoon which hit Taiwan, East China and North Korea.
- Typhoon Kit (1957) (T5720, 18W) – another Category 5-equivalent typhoon that struck the Philippines during the 1957 elections, causing 19 deaths.
- Typhoon Kit (1960) (T6022, 47W) – a large typhoon which struck the Philippines, South China and northern Vietnam, resulting to at least 149 fatalities.
- Typhoon Kit (1963) (T6318, 35W, Rosing) – a powerful Category 4-equivalent typhoon that remained at sea.
- Typhoon Kit (1966) (T6604, 04W, Emang) – one of the most intense typhoons recorded in the Western Pacific; struck Japan and killed 64.
- Typhoon Kit (1968) (T6823, 27W) – a minimal typhoon which affected no land areas.
- Typhoon Kit (1972) (T7201, 01W, Asiang-Biring) – an unusually strong early-season typhoon that devastated central and southern Philippines in early-January 1972, claiming at least 204 lives.
- Tropical Storm Kit (1974) (T7432, 36W, Delang) – a late-season tropical storm which affected southern Philippines.
- Severe Tropical Storm Kit (1978) (T7820, 21W, Uding) – a tropical storm that crossed the Philippines and Vietnam.
- Typhoon Kit (1981) (T8128, 28W, Kadiang) – strong, late-season typhoon which affected Mindanao as a remnant low.
- Typhoon Kit (1985) (T8508, 08W) – a long-lived and erratic typhoon that skirted southwestern Japan before hitting South Korea, leading to the loss of 12 lives.
- Severe Tropical Storm Kit (1988) (T8821, 17W, Maring) – a tropical storm which affected northern Luzon and Hong Kong.
