= List of storms named Kevin =

The name Kevin has been used for nine tropical cyclones worldwide: seven in the East Pacific Ocean, one in the Australian region, and one in the South Pacific Ocean.

In the East Pacific:

- Tropical Storm Kevin (1985) – remained at sea
- Hurricane Kevin (1991) – Category 4 major hurricane that caused no damage or casualties
- Tropical Storm Kevin (1997) – stayed out to sea
- Tropical Storm Kevin (2003) – weak tropical storm that paralleled the Baja California peninsula
- Tropical Storm Kevin (2009) – stayed out to sea
- Tropical Storm Kevin (2015) – remained at sea
- Tropical Storm Kevin (2021) – paralleled the west coast of Mexico

In the Australian region:

- Cyclone Kevin (1979) – off-season system that took an unusual zig-zag path

In the South Pacific:

- Cyclone Kevin (2023) – powerful Category 5 severe tropical cyclone that impacted Vanuatu
