= List of storms named Krising =

The name Krising has been used to name five tropical cyclones in the Philippine Area of Responsibility in the West Pacific Ocean:

- Severe Tropical Storm Faye–Gloria (1971) (T7132/7133, 34W/35W, Krising-Dadang) – a system which made landfall in Luzon twice in October after executing a loop
- Tropical Storm Ben (1979) (T7924, 28W, Krising) – a late-season tropical storm which struck the Philippine
- Severe Tropical Storm Thelma (1983) (T8323, 24W, Krising) – a late-season system which stayed at seas
