= List of storms named Katring =

The name Katring has been used for five tropical cyclones in the Philippine Area of Responsibility in the Western Pacific Ocean.

- Typhoon Wayne (1983) (T8304, 04W, Katring) – a Category 4-equivalent super typhoon that affected the Philippines and China
- Typhoon Thelma (1987) (T8705, 05W, Katring) – a Category 4-equivalent super typhoon that became the worst typhoon to affect South Korea since 1959
- Typhoon Teresa (1994) (T9430, 34W, Katring) – a Category 1 typhoon that was one of four simultaneously active tropical cyclones in the West Pacific
- Tropical Storm Sonamu (2006) (T0611, 12W, Katring) – did not affect land
- Typhoon Chaba (2010) (T1014, 16W, Katring) – a Category 4-equivalent typhoon that affected Japan

The name Katring was retired following the 2010 Pacific typhoon season and was replaced with Karding.
