= List of storms named Kendra =

The name Kendra has been used for two cyclones in the Atlantic Ocean. It was used on the old four-year lists.

- Tropical Storm Kendra (1966) – an eastern Atlantic October storm that was operationally declared a tropical storm but later determined to have not even been a tropical cyclone and was removed from the official records until 2022 when re-analysis determined it was not a tropical cyclone.
- Hurricane Kendra (1978) – a Category 1 hurricane that stayed in the ocean and did not affect land.
