= List of storms named Khanun =

The name Khanun (Thai: ขนุน, pronounced [kʰā.nǔn]) has been used for four tropical cyclones in the western North Pacific Ocean. The name was contributed by Thailand and means jackfruit (Artocarpus heterophyllus) in Thai.

- Typhoon Khanun (2005) (T0515, 15W, Kiko), struck China as a Category 3 typhoon.
- Severe Tropical Storm Khanun (2012) (T1207, 08W, Enteng), the first tropical cyclone to directly impact Korea in two years, claimed 89 lives.
- Typhoon Khanun (2017) (T1720, 24W, Odette), a mid-range Category 2 typhoon that affected Hainan island as a weak tropical storm.
- Typhoon Khanun (2023) (T2306, 06W, Falcon), a potent Category 4 typhoon that lingered in the Okinawa Islands, and eventually struck Korea.

Preceded by Bori	Pacific typhoon season names Khanun	Succeeded by Lan
