= List of storms named Kirrily =

The name Kirrily has been used for four tropical cyclones in the Australian region of the Southern Hemisphere:

- Cyclone Kirrily (1989) – a strong tropical cyclone that never affected land.
- Cyclone Kirrily (2000) – a strong tropical cyclone that never affected land.
- Cyclone Kirrily (2009) – a weak Category 1 tropical cyclone that made landfall over Aru Islands.
- Cyclone Kirrily (2024) – a Category 3 severe tropical cyclone that made landfall in Queensland.

Following the 2023–24 season, the name Kirrily was retired from the rotating list of names for the Australian Region; it will never be used to name a storm in that area again. It was replaced with Kima for future seasons.
