= Cyclone Koji (2026) =

Category 2 Australian region cyclone

Tropical Cyclone Koji
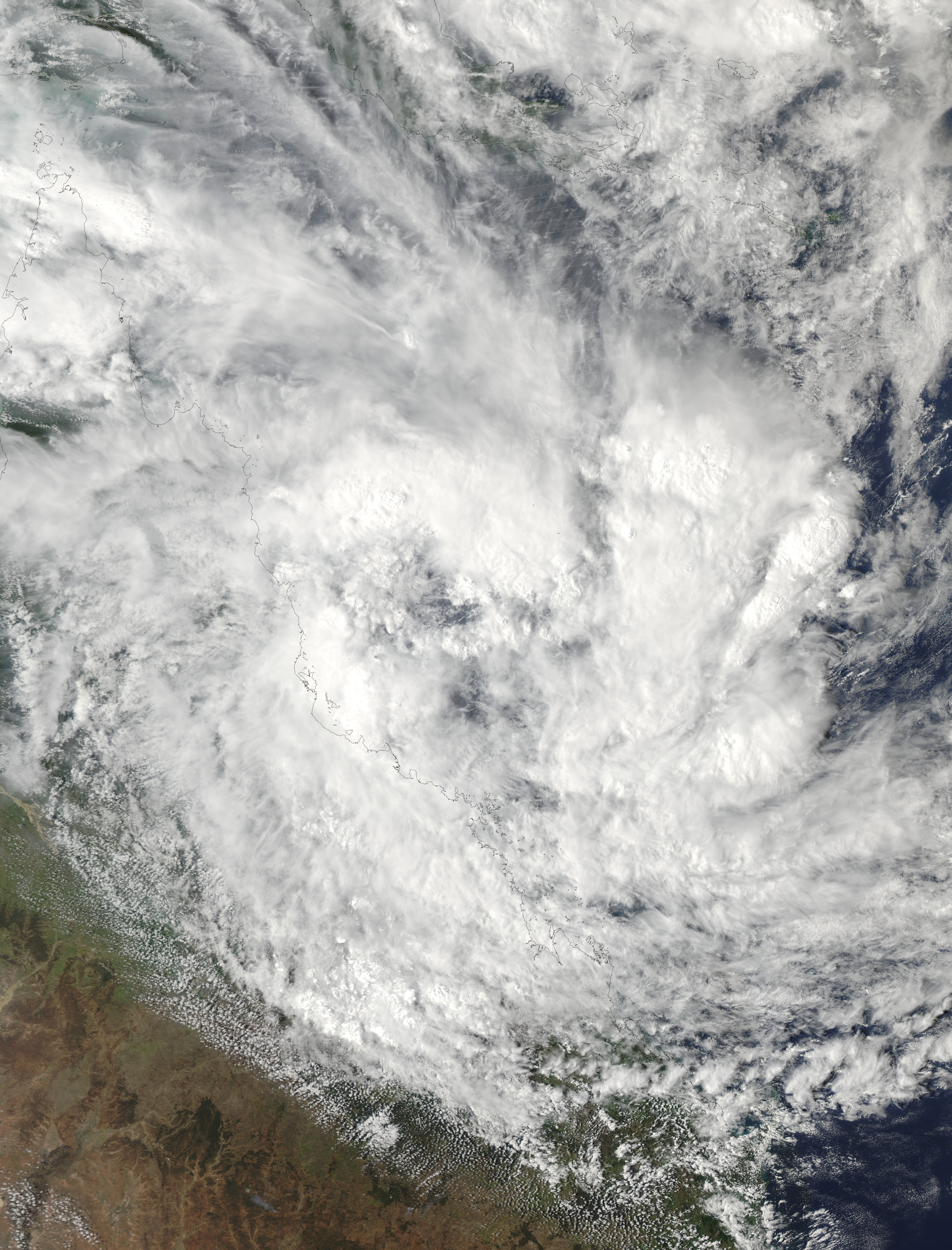
- Cyclone Koji intensifying offshore Queensland on 10 January

Meteorological history
- Formed: 7 January 2026
- Remnant low: 10 January 2026
- Dissipated: 14 January 2026

Category 2 tropical cyclone
- 10-minute sustained (BOM)
- Highest winds: 100 km/h (65 mph)
- Lowest pressure: 987 hPa (mbar); 29.15 inHg

Tropical storm
- 1-minute sustained (SSHWS/JTWC)
- Highest winds: 75 km/h (45 mph)
- Lowest pressure: 988 hPa (mbar); 29.18 inHg

Overall effects
- Fatalities: None
- Damage: $38.4 million (2026 USD)
- Areas affected: Papua New Guinea, Queensland
- Part of the 2025–26 Australian region cyclone season

Tropical Cyclone Koji was a short-lived, broad tropical cyclone that affected Northern Queensland, Australia during January 2026. The seventh named storm of the 2025–26 Australian region cyclone season, Koji originated from a tropical low-pressure area in the north Coral Sea. On 7 January, the disturbance was designated as Tropical Low 12U by the Bureau of Meteorology (BoM) while moving southward. Three days later, the low intensified into a category 2 tropical cyclone on the Australian scale and was assigned the name Koji. Shortly after, Koji began quickly began to weaken and was downgraded to a tropical low the following day. Koji then crossed the northern coast of Queensland between Ayr and Bowen.

Despite falling below tropical cyclone strength prior to landfall, remnant moisture from Koji generated thunderstorms that produced rainfall up to 700 millimetres (28 in) in portions of Queensland, resulting in severe flash flooding. Energy companies reported that 23,000 homes were left without power at the height of the storm. Damage was the most severe in the town of Clermont, where 71 homes were inundated. Following the storm, disaster funds and donations were made to communities affected. The Premier of Queensland reported that over 50,000 cattle had been lost during the storm. Damage from Koji totaled to AU$53.5 million (US$38.4 million).

== Meteorological history ==
Map plotting the storm's track and intensity, according to the Saffir–Simpson scale Map key Saffir–Simpson scale Tropical depression (≤38 mph, ≤62 km/h) Tropical storm (39–73 mph, 63–118 km/h) Category 1 (74–95 mph, 119–153 km/h) Category 2 (96–110 mph, 154–177 km/h) Category 3 (111–129 mph, 178–208 km/h) Category 4 (130–156 mph, 209–251 km/h) Category 5 (≥157 mph, ≥252 km/h) Unknown Storm type Tropical cyclone Subtropical cyclone Extratropical cyclone, remnant low, tropical disturbance, or monsoon depression

The origins of Koji can be traced back to a tropical low formed along a monsoon trough in the north Coral Sea. On 7 January, the Bureau of Meteorology (BoM) designated the system as Tropical Low 12U. The low drifted to the west until 9 January, when it turned south from the influence of a mid-level ridge and monsoon trough. Northerly monsoon flow and increasing southeasterly wind shear caused the low to grow in size. Gales began to wrap around the centre of the low and the BoM upgraded the low to a category 2 tropical cyclone on the Australian scale and assigned the name Koji on 10 January at 06:00 UTC. The wind field of the system began to contract, causing the Joint Typhoon Warning Center (JTWC) to initiate advisories on the system, designating the low as Tropical Cyclone 13P. The BoM noted that cyclone began to quickly weaken, downgrading Koji to a category 1 tropical cyclone nine hours later. Koji weakened further with the BoM downgrading the cyclone to a tropical low six hours later. The JTWC noted that Koji remained disorganized, with the majority of convection being displaced from the centre of the system. Early the next day, Koji made landfall on the Queensland coast at tropical low intensity between Ayr and Bowen. The tropical low continued to move south before turning to the west later that day. The low then dissipated inland over Queensland two days later, early on 14 January.

== Preparations ==
On 7 January 2026, the City of Townsville conducted controlled releases of water from the Ross River Dam to reduce the flood risk. The Bureau of Meteorology (BoM) warned of gale-force winds from Koji and issued storm warnings from Townsville to Mackay. Flights at Townsville Airport and on Hamilton Island were cancelled. More than 1,500 tonnes (1,700 short tons) of sand nearly 70,000 sandbags were deployed in Townsville. However, preparations in the city were hindered by an attempted theft of copper which resulted in severed telecommunication lines.

Residents in Palm Island were evacuated while residents in Cairns were urged to only use water for drinking, washing, and cooking. Several flood warnings were issued for Finch Hatton, Eungella, and western portions of Mackay. A major flood warning was issued for the Pioneer River in Mirani. Premier of Queensland David Crisafulli deployed 92 police, 35 emergency service personnel, and 79 fire rescue personnel. Sixty State Emergency Service boats and multiple helicopters were mobilized for potential rescues. Shipping operations were suspended at major coal export terminals near Mackay and Bowen. Forecasters warned that flooding could be exacerbated by saturated soils from rainfall the previous week.

== Impact ==
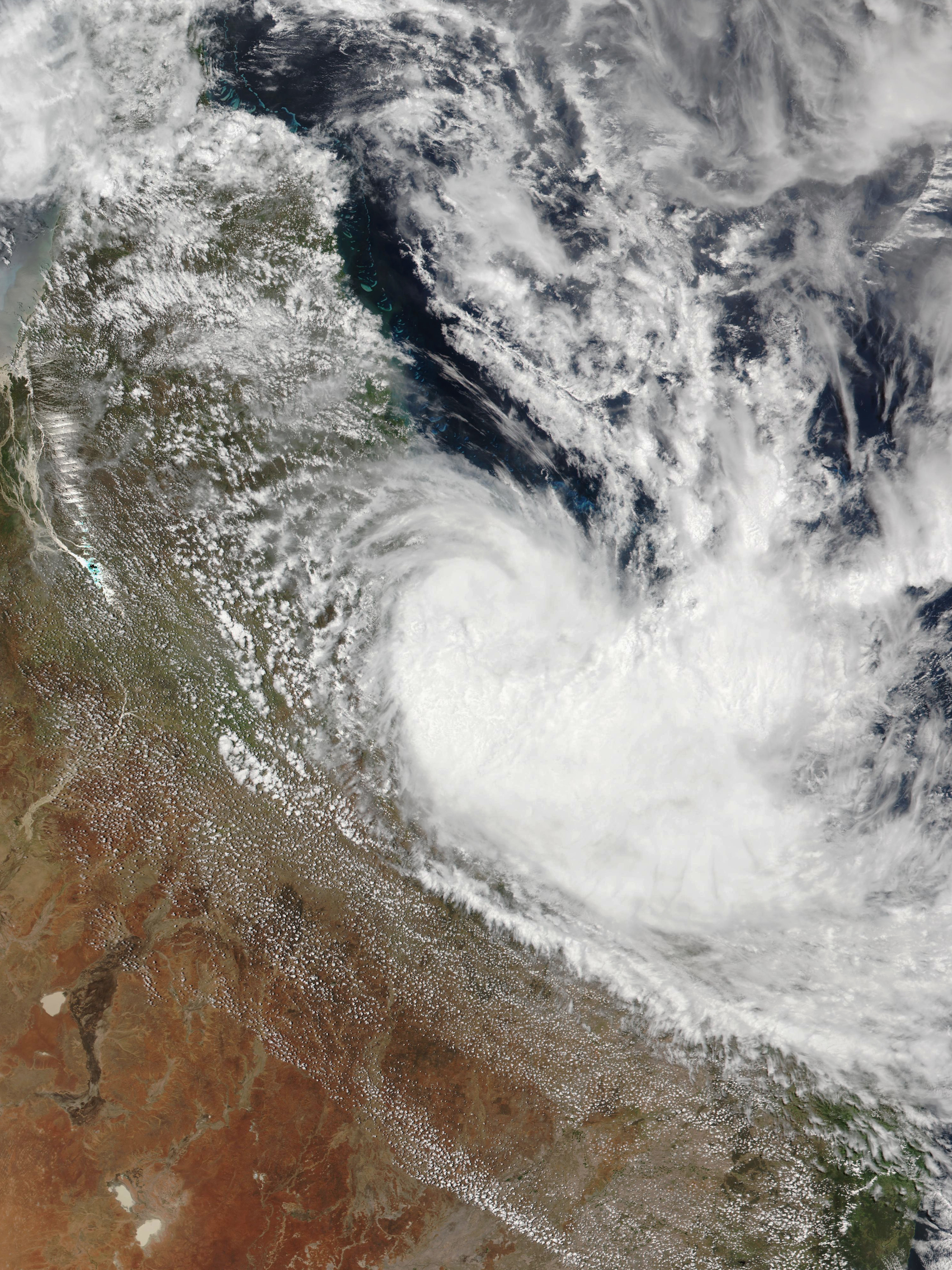
Koji making landfall in Queensland

In Mackay, over 700 millimetres (28 in) of rain fell in a 48 hour period. Several locations recorded very high 48 hour rainfall totals, including 601 millimetres (23.7 in) observed at Mount William, and several locations in the Pioneer River catchment recorded 24 hour totals in excess of 350 millimetres (14 in). Clermont reported a rainfall total of 203 millimetres (8.0 in) in a single day, the highest daily rainfall recorded in the town since 1916. Gargett recorded 146 millimetres (5.7 in) of rain in just two hours. A maximum storm tide of 0.5–1.0 metre (1.6–3.3 ft) was reported near Bowen and Airlie Beach. Willis Island recorded wind gusts of 133 kilometres per hour (83 mph) while Hamilton Island recorded wind gusts of 117 kilometres per hour (73 mph).

Strong winds caused fences, trees, and power lines to fall while heavy rainfall flooded roadways and bridges, triggered several landslides, and caused rivers to overflow their banks. Ergon Energy reported that Koji left around 23,000 customers without power, with the majority of the outages being localized to Mackay and Whitsunday. More than 3,000 kilometres (1,900 mi) of fences and nearly 5,000 kilometres (3,100 mi) of private roads were damaged by Koji. Officials reported widespread damage to the railways, identifying over 13 kilometres (8.1 mi) of track damaged and 56 sites in need of repairs. Flooded roads cut off access to coal mines in Dysart. More than 120 potholes and at least 269 weather-related emergency calls were reported in Townsville.

Floodwaters left 3,000 residents in the town of Clermont temporarily isolated. Around 71 homes were affected by the flooding, four of which suffered considerable water damage. The town of Eungella received damage to roads, leaving the community of 200 residents isolated for more than 72 hours. Suncorp Group received 470 property and vehicle damage claims, most of which in Mackay. Twenty five boats were destroyed by Koji, leaving several people homeless. One resident sustained an economic loss of AU$200,000 (US$142,000) from the storm. Communities in the Pioneer Valley were left without potable water after reservoirs were affected by ground movement.

Premier Crisafulli stated that over 50,000 cattle were lost to the event with many people have not having a chance to do a damage assessment. Floodwaters injured several cattle and horses and destroyed AU$22,000 (US$16,000) worth of hay on a farm in Clermont. Floodwaters swept away 2 tonnes (2.2 short tons) of fertilizer and AU$10,000 (US$7,000) worth of grass seed on a farm in Mackay. The owner of the Broken River Mountain Resort in Eungella estimated a potential economic loss of AU$40,000 (US$28,000) from booking cancellations.

Floodwaters overtook vehicles and inundated homes, forcing residents to seek higher ground to await rescue services. In Cairns, a 79-year-old man was rescued from the rooftop of his campervan. In Bogie, a woman and her children were rescued after their car was swept away by floodwaters. In the Isaac Region, a water rescue team evacuated two people from a home. In Finch Hatton, two men and five children were rescued after floodwaters forced them climb on top of tables. In Mackay, another man was rescued after he was swept away by the Pioneer River while attempting to reach his yacht. In Airlie Beach, a couple was forced to abandon their boat after it sustained severe damage from Koji.

Qantas, Virgin Australia, and Jetstar cancelled over 80 regional flights due to inclement weather. A jetty leading to South Molle Island was damaged, causing a restriction of public access to the island. Additionally, a resort project in Lindeman Island was delayed due to damage from Koji. A stinger net was damaged at Picnic Bay. Hiking trails in Finch Hatton were closed following the flooding. In Rockhampton, riverside facilities and car parks were closed after heavy rain caused the Fitzroy River to swell above its flood level. However, sugar farmers only sustained minor crop damage from Koji and rainfall was considered beneficial for Clermont cotton farmers. Despite the severity of the damage, no deaths were reported.

Additionally, remnant moisture from Koji combined with another low pressure system to produce severe thunderstorms over Victoria. Severe flash flooding along the Great Ocean Road damaged dozens of vehicles, displaced 200-400 people, and necessitated the rescue of a least six people.

== Aftermath ==
Following the storm, Prime Minister of Australia Anthony Albanese announced that a disaster recovery fund worth AU$26 million (US$18.4 million) would be distributed to communities affected by the flooding. Primary producers would receive AU$11.32 million (US$8.02 million) in funds while mental health programs, regional councils, and small businesses would receive grants worth AU$4 million (US$2.83 million), AU$1 million (US$708,000), and AU$25,000 (US$18,000), respectively. Twenty four local governments were mobilized for disaster recovery funding. Redland City State Emergency Service deployed 22 volunteers to assist with emergency response in Northern Queensland communities affected by the flooding. A cargo ship from Brisbane was sent to Cairns to distribute food supplies to communities impacted by the flooding. More than 150 volunteers from Eco Barge worked to remove debris from boats damaged by the storm.

Queensland ranchers blamed extensive livestock losses on the failure of river flood gauges. Queensland Corrective Services donated 88 bales of hay to farmers affected by the flooding in Clermont. Four people were hospitalized after contracting melioidosis from stagnant floodwaters. In Townsville, four road crews were deployed to complete repairs on damaged roadways. Approximately 1,300 tonnes (1,400 short tons) of ballast were used to complete repairs to railroads damaged by Koji. Coal prices increased from AU$218.75 to AU$232.95 per ton as a result of flooded mines and damaged railways.

== See also ==
- Weather of 2026
- Tropical cyclones in 2026
- 2025–26 Australian region cyclone season
