= Tropical Storm Kelly =

Western Pacific tropical storm in 1981

Severe Tropical Storm Kelly (Daling)
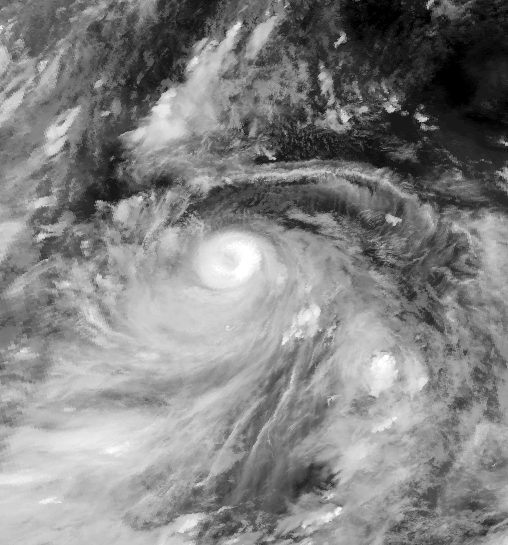
- Kelly near peak intensity on July 3

Meteorological history
- Formed: June 27, 1981
- Dissipated: July 6, 1981

Severe tropical storm
- 10-minute sustained (JMA)
- Highest winds: 110 km/h (70 mph)
- Lowest pressure: 975 hPa (mbar); 28.79 inHg

Category 1-equivalent typhoon
- 1-minute sustained (SSHWS/JTWC)
- Highest winds: 140 km/h (85 mph)
- Lowest pressure: 966 hPa (mbar); 28.53 inHg

Overall effects
- Fatalities: 192 total
- Damage: $7.8 million (1981 USD)
- Areas affected: Philippines, China
- IBTrACS
- Part of the 1981 Pacific typhoon season

Severe Tropical Storm Kelly, known in the Philippines as Tropical Storm Daling, was a weak but destructive tropical storm that struck the Philippines in June 1981. A tropical disturbance organized into a tropical depression east of the Philippines on June 28. It tracked westward, reaching a tropical storm on June 30 before hitting the central Philippines. Kelly weakened over the islands, but re-strengthened over the South China Sea, nearly attaining typhoon status on July 2. The system passed through the southern Hainan Island on July 3. The cyclone then crossed the Gulf of Tonkin as a weakening tropical storm, and made landfall in northern Vietnam on July 4 as a tropical storm. Kelly dissipated two days later inland.

Tropical Storm Kelly was the worst storm to affect the Philippines in eight months. Nine towns in a 6,920 km (4,300 mi) area near the Mayon Volcano sustained flooding. Over 1,450 km (900 mi) of railways lines were washed out. At least 800 homes were destroyed while 3,845 ha (9,500 acres) of rice fields were ruined. More than 3,600 individuals were displaced. Overall, damage totaled to $7.8 million (1981 USD). (Note: All currencies are converted to United States Dollars using Philippines Measuring worth with an exchange rate of the year 1981.)

== Meteorological history ==
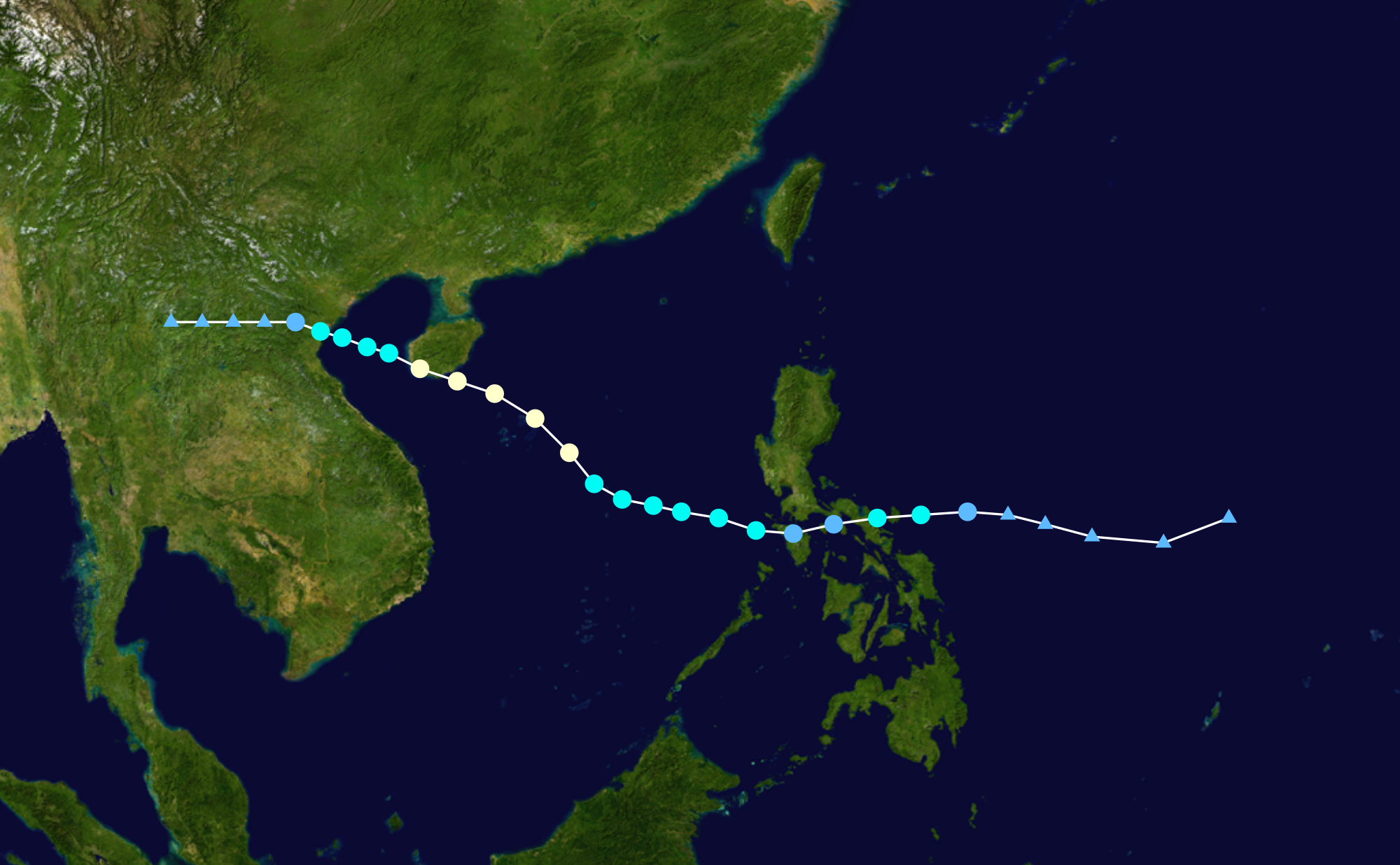
Map plotting the storm's track and intensity, according to the Saffir–Simpson scale Map key Saffir–Simpson scale Tropical depression (≤38 mph, ≤62 km/h) Tropical storm (39–73 mph, 63–118 km/h) Category 1 (74–95 mph, 119–153 km/h) Category 2 (96–110 mph, 154–177 km/h) Category 3 (111–129 mph, 178–208 km/h) Category 4 (130–156 mph, 209–251 km/h) Category 5 (≥157 mph, ≥252 km/h) Unknown Storm type Tropical cyclone Subtropical cyclone Extratropical cyclone, remnant low, tropical disturbance, or monsoon depression

The origins of Tropical Storm Kelly can be traced back to an area of disturbed weather that was first detected by weather satellite imagery on June 25. Although the system was well-organized at this time, there was little evidence of a low-level circulation. (Note: Wind estimates from the JMA and most other basins throughout the world are sustained over 10 minutes, while estimates from the United States-based Joint Typhoon Warning Center are sustained over 1 minute. 10 minute winds are about 1.14 times the amount of 1 minute winds.) Despite this, the Japan Meteorological Agency (JMA) started watching the system. (Note: The Japan Meteorological Agency is the official Regional Specialized Meteorological Center for the western Pacific Ocean.) Meanwhile, Dvorak classifications were placed at T2.5, equivalent to 65 km/h (40 mph). Based on this, a Tropical Cyclone Formation Alert (TCFA) was issued that evening as the system moved west. However, on June 26, the TCFA was cancelled. Midday on June 28, following an increase in convection, the TCFA was re-issued. On that day, the Philippine Atmospheric, Geophysical and Astronomical Services Administration (PAGASA) also monitored the storm and assigned it with the local name Daling. After further development and a subsequent TCFA, the Joint Typhoon Warning Center (JTWC) classified the system as a tropical depression on June 30.

At 0600 UTC on June 30, the JTWC upgraded the depression into Tropical Storm Kelly. Twelve hours later, the JMA followed suit. At this time, Tropical storm Kelly moved ashore along the central Philippines. Due to land interaction, the tropical cyclone became less organized. Six hours after landfall, the JTWC downgraded Kelly into a depression, even though the JMA maintained Kelly as a tropical storm thorough its passage through the country. After emerging into the South China Sea, Kelly resumed deepening. At 0600 UTC on July 1, the JTWC re-upgraded Kelly into a tropical storm. After turning northwest, After exiting PASGA's warning zone, Kelly continued to strengthen, and midday on July 2, the JMA estimated that the storm reached its peak intensity of 115 km/h (70 mph). Several hours later, the JTWC upgraded Kelly to a typhoon. At 0300 UTC on July 3, surface observations from the Paracel Islands indicated winds of 134 km/h (83 mph) and a pressure of 970 mbar (29 inHg). Based on this, the JTWC reported that Kelly reached its peak wind speed of 135 km/h (85 mph). Meanwhile, the JMA noted that Kelly attained its peak barometric pressure of 975 mbar (28.8 inHg). Thereafter, the storm's eye became less defined and the surrounding convection weakened. On the evening of July 3, the eye collapsed as Kelly skirted southern Hai-nan. Due to land interaction, Kelly continued to weaken and early on July 4, the JTWC downgraded the typhoon into a tropical storm. Later that morning, the eye briefly re-developed over the Gulf of Tonkin; however, no re-intensification occurred as Kelly remained poorly organized. Late on July 4, Kelly made landfall as a 95 km/h (60 mph) tropical storm 185 km (115 mi) south of Hanoi in Vietnam. On July 5, the JTWC stopped monitoring the system as it had moved inland. The JMA followed suit the next day.

== Impact and aftermath ==
Tropical Storm Kelly was the worst storm to affect the Philippines in eight months. Mudslides were reported along the slopes of the Mayon volcano, as a result, many nearby villages were destroyed. Some people were buried under rocks and debris due to mudslides. Nine towns in an 6,920 km (4,300 mi) area were flooded. Huts and rice feels were inundated by mud in debris in parts of Legaspi, Daragan, Ligao, and Camalig. The towns of Ligao, Oas, Camalig and Guinobatan were the worst affected by Kelly. Although winds were not very strong, many rivers overflowed their banks. In the Albay Province, more than 1,450 km (900 mi) of railways lines were washed out. Over 800 dwellings were destroyed, including 597 houses made of light wood and straw, were destroyed and 9,500 acres (3,845 ha) of rice field were destroyed. More than 3,600 persons lost their homes.

One hundred ninety-two fatalities were reported, including 120 casualties in the Albay Province and five in Ligao. Nine cities sustained fatalities near the Mayon volcano, Twelve children also died. Nine individuals were also listed missing and 30 were injured. Most of the fatalities were due to drownings. Overall, damage totaled to $7.8 million, including $3.7 million from infrastructure. Losses were estimated at $1.1 million. Following the storm, relief teams were sent in to provide aid such as rice and sardines for the homeless. A few days following Kelly, the island nation was struck by Tropical Storm Lynn, which was responsible for further destruction.

== See also ==
- Tropical Storm Bebinca (2013)
- Tropical Storm Rumbia (2013)
- Tropical Storm Zita
- Tropical Storm Koni
