= Typhoon Ora (1972) =

Pacific typhoon in 1972

Typhoon Ora (Konsing)
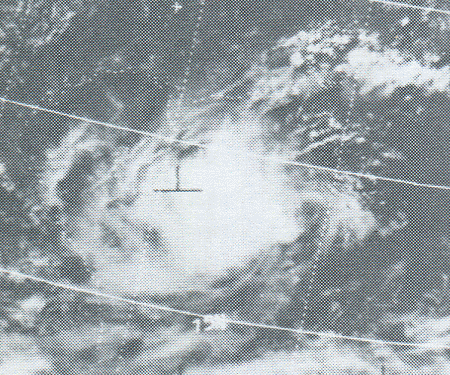
- Ora before landfall in southeastern China on June 26

Meteorological history
- Formed: June 22, 1972
- Dissipated: June 30, 1972

Typhoon
- 10-minute sustained (JMA)
- Highest winds: 180 km/h (115 mph)

Category 1-equivalent typhoon
- 1-minute sustained (SSHWS/JTWC)
- Highest winds: 150 km/h (90 mph)

Overall effects
- Fatalities: 131
- Damage: $15 million (1972 USD)
- Areas affected: Philippines, China
- IBTrACS
- Part of the 1972 Pacific typhoon season

Typhoon Ora, known in the Philippines as Typhoon Konsing, was a June 1972 Category 1 typhoon that left 131 people dead and $15 million (1972 USD, $68.4 million 2005 USD) in damage. Manila experienced widespread flooding as the typhoon tracked close to the city.

== Meteorological history ==
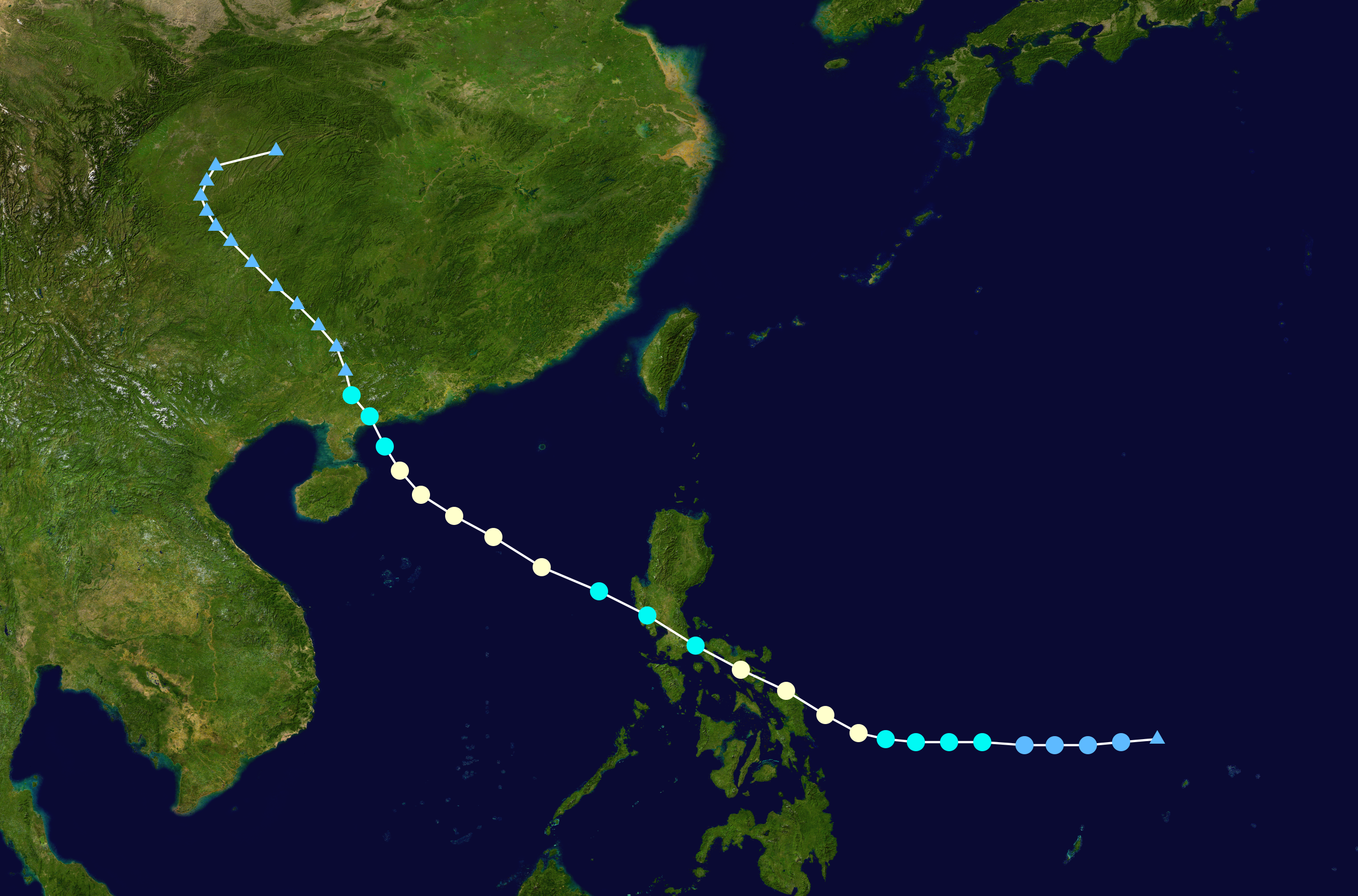
Map plotting the storm's track and intensity, according to the Saffir–Simpson scale Map key Saffir–Simpson scale Tropical depression (≤38 mph, ≤62 km/h) Tropical storm (39–73 mph, 63–118 km/h) Category 1 (74–95 mph, 119–153 km/h) Category 2 (96–110 mph, 154–177 km/h) Category 3 (111–129 mph, 178–208 km/h) Category 4 (130–156 mph, 209–251 km/h) Category 5 (≥157 mph, ≥252 km/h) Unknown Storm type Tropical cyclone Subtropical cyclone Extratropical cyclone, remnant low, tropical disturbance, or monsoon depression

A tropical wave embedded in a trough formed on June 20 and moved westward without development. By June 23, the disturbance had strengthened, and became Tropical Storm Ora about 330 miles east of the Philippines.

Although poorly organized, Ora continued strengthening, becoming a Category 1 typhoon before encountering a high pressure system.

The area of high pressure forced the storm to make landfall on Luzon on June 25, emerging over the South China Sea later that day. Ora then continued its northwest track, turning northeast near Hainan Island and making landfall in southern China as a tropical storm. Ora then weakened and dissipated after moving inland.

== Impact ==
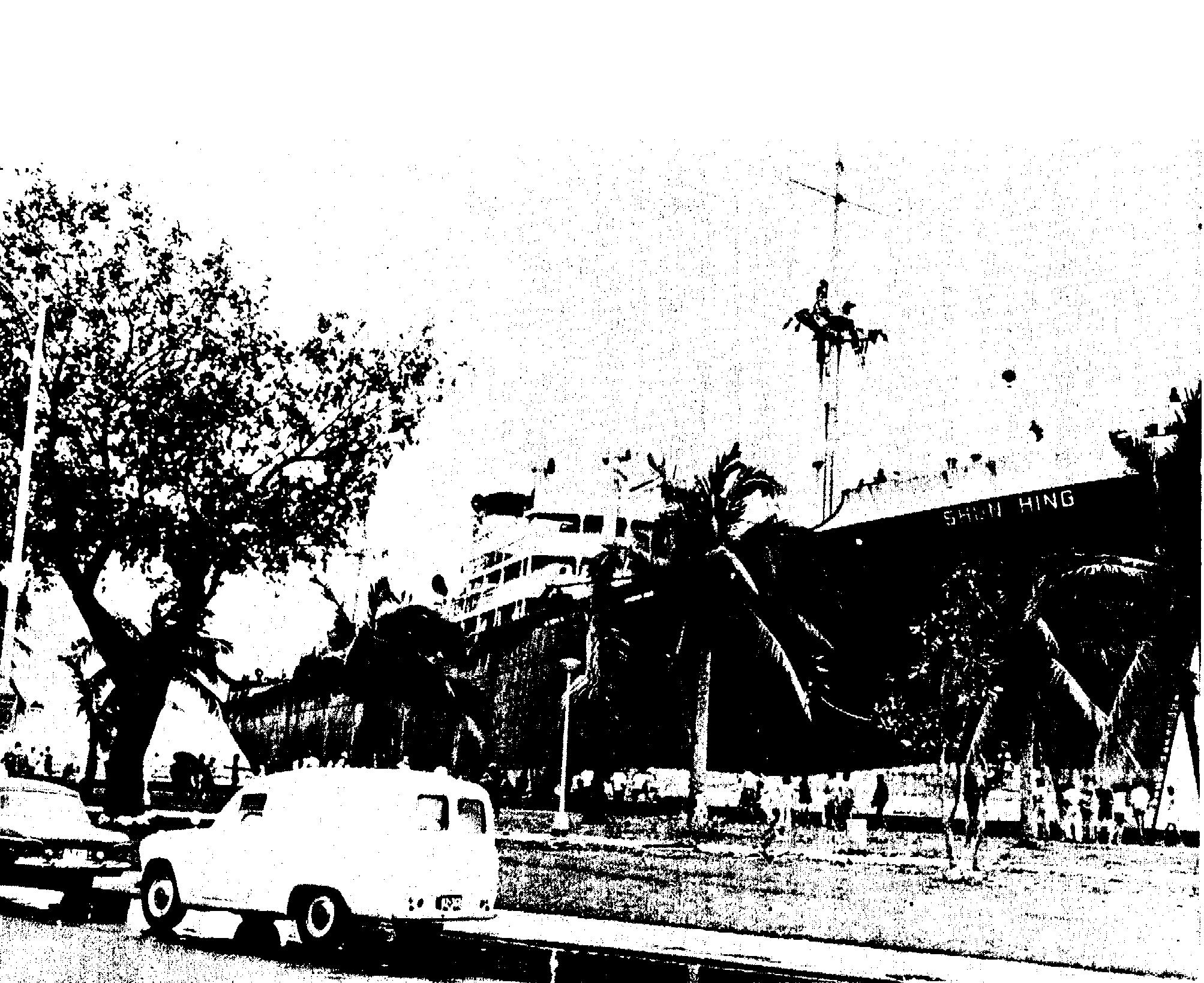
Ship run aground by Typhoon Ora

Ora made landfall in the Philippines and again in southern China. The first landfall brought 115 mph gusts and 9.3 inches (236.2 mm) of rain in a 24-hour period to Luzon. Flashfloods from Ora damaged homes and businesses, and the storm surge caused many ships offshore to run aground. A sailboat capsized near Rapu Rapu during the storm, causing one fatality. Three others were declared missing. In the Philippines, Ora caused 131 deaths, left almost 400,000 people homeless and left behind $15 million (1972 USD, $68.4 million 2005 USD) worth of damage.

Oras second landfall was in southeastern China as a tropical storm on June 27, however deaths or damage during that landfall is unavailable.

== See also ==
- Tropical cyclone
