= Typhoon Kinna =

Pacific typhoon in 1991

Typhoon Kinna (Neneng)
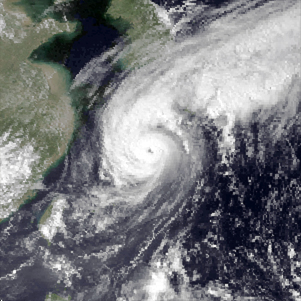
- Typhoon Kinna early on September 13

Meteorological history
- Formed: September 10, 1991
- Extratropical: September 14, 1991
- Dissipated: September 16, 1991

Typhoon
- 10-minute sustained (JMA)
- Highest winds: 150 km/h (90 mph)
- Lowest pressure: 955 hPa (mbar); 28.20 inHg

Category 2-equivalent typhoon
- 1-minute sustained (SSHWS/JTWC)
- Highest winds: 165 km/h (105 mph)
- Lowest pressure: 954 hPa (mbar); 28.17 inHg

Overall effects
- Fatalities: 11 total
- Damage: $383 million (1991 USD)
- Areas affected: Japan
- IBTrACS
- Part of the 1991 Pacific typhoon season

Typhoon Kinna, known in the Philippines as Typhoon Neneng, was a mid-season typhoon that struck Japan during 1991. An area of disturbed weather formed within the Western Pacific monsoon trough during early September 1991. The disturbance was upgraded into a tropical depression on September 10 after an increase in organization. Tracking northwest due to a weak subtropical ridge to its north, the depression strengthened into a tropical storm at 00:00 UTC on September 11. Later that day, Kinna was upgraded into a severe tropical storm. Following the development of a poorly defined eye, Kinna was upgraded into a typhoon on September 12. The cyclone turned north in response to a trough and passed through Okinawa as a minimal typhoon. Typhoon Kinna obtained peak intensity on September 13, but thereafter, Kinna accelerated north-northeastward toward Kyushu, passing over the island that day at peak intensity. Typhoon Kinna rapidly transitioned into an extratropical low as it tracked along the northern coast of Honshu. Its extratropical remnants were last noted on the evening of September 16.

Even though most of the damage occurred on Kyushu and on western Honshu, the typhoon was the most destructive tropical cyclone to strike Okinawa since 1987, and was also the first of typhoon intensity to pass directly over the island since Typhoon Vera in 1986. Nationwide, 11 people were killed and 94 others suffered injuries. Nearly 50,000 customers lost power. Close to 150 domestic flights were cancelled, which left 26,000 travelers stranded. A total of 382 houses were destroyed while 2,586 others were flooded. There were 213 landslides and 9 bridges were washed out. Nearly 70 ships along with 47 roads and 875 hectares (2,160 acres) of farmland were damaged. In all, damage was estimated at ¥51.1 billion (1991 US$383 million).

== Meteorological history ==
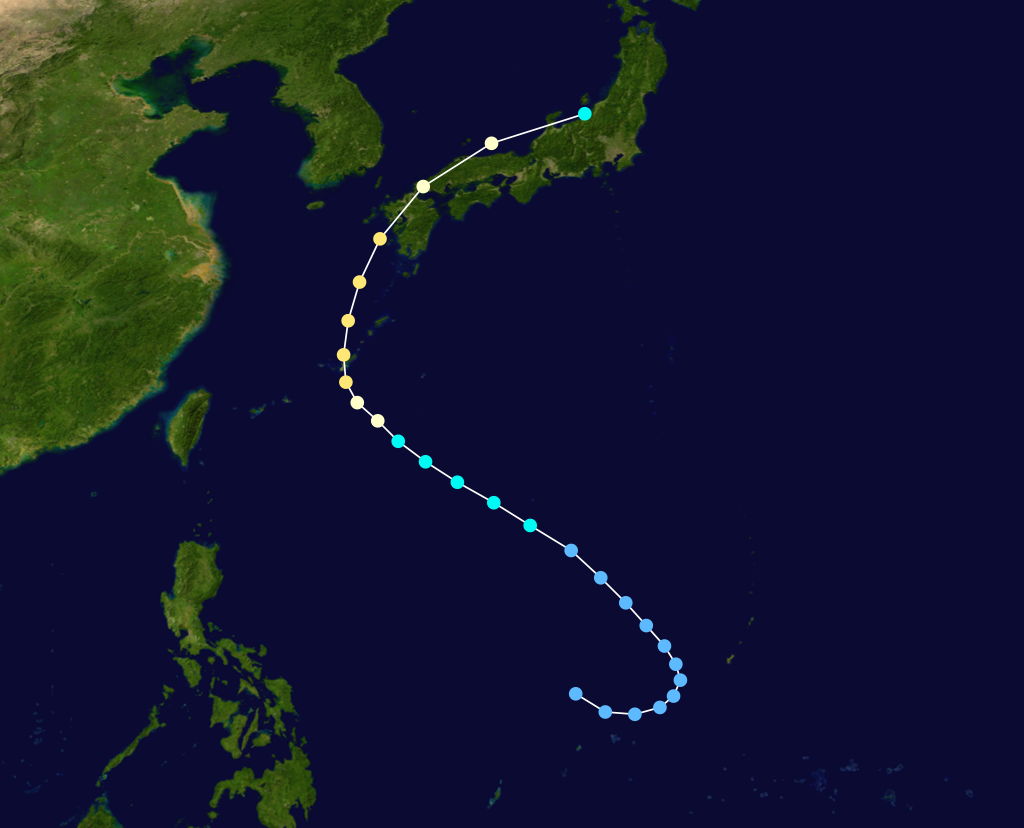
Map plotting the storm's track and intensity, according to the Saffir–Simpson scale Map key Saffir–Simpson scale Tropical depression (≤38 mph, ≤62 km/h) Tropical storm (39–73 mph, 63–118 km/h) Category 1 (74–95 mph, 119–153 km/h) Category 2 (96–110 mph, 154–177 km/h) Category 3 (111–129 mph, 178–208 km/h) Category 4 (130–156 mph, 209–251 km/h) Category 5 (≥157 mph, ≥252 km/h) Unknown Storm type Tropical cyclone Subtropical cyclone Extratropical cyclone, remnant low, tropical disturbance, or monsoon depression

Typhoon Kinna formed in the western Caroline Islands in the Western Pacific monsoon trough, which extended across the Philippine Sea in early September. On September 8, synoptic data revealed that an area of low pressure was developing southwest of Guam. When satellite imagery showed an increase in convection near the low's circulation center, the Joint Typhoon Warning Center (JTWC) started tracking the system on September 9. An increase in organization prompted the JTWC to issue a Tropical Cyclone Formation Alert on the morning of September 10. At noon, both the Japan Meteorological Agency (JMA) and the JTWC upgraded the system into a tropical depression. (Note: Wind estimates from the JMA and most other basins throughout the world are sustained over 10 minutes, while estimates from the United States-based Joint Typhoon Warning Center are sustained over 1 minute. 10-minute winds are about 1.14 times the amount of 1-minute winds.) At the time, the depression was located approximately 460 km (285 mi) west-northwest of Guam.

The depression initially tracked northwest due to a weak subtropical ridge to its north. At 00:00 UTC on September 11, the JTWC upgraded the depression into Tropical Storm Kinna, with the JMA doing the same later that morning. (Note: The Japan Meteorological Agency is the official Regional Specialized Meteorological Center for the western Pacific Ocean.) At 18:00 UTC, the JMA classified Kinna as a severe tropical storm. The development of a poorly defined eye within a central dense overcast prompted the JTWC to upgrade Kinna into a typhoon on the morning of September 12, although the JMA did not follow suit until 18:00 UTC. Also on September 12, a mid-tropospheric trough deepened over the East China Sea, which split the ridge near 125th meridian east. In response, Typhoon Kinna turned northward toward the break in the ridge and tracked across Okinawa. Shortly after becoming a typhoon, the eye crossed densely populated southern Okinawa. At 00:00 UTC on September 13, the JTWC and JMA estimated that Kinna attained peak winds of 170 and 145 km/h (105 and 90 mph), with the latter estimating a minimum barometric pressure of 955 mbar (28.2 inHg). After recurvature, Kinna accelerated north-northeastward toward Kyushu as it maintained its intensity. Later on September 13, the typhoon's eyewall passed over the cities of Nagasaki and Sasebo on Kyushu. Kinna rapidly lost tropical characteristics as it tracked along the northern coast of Honshu. The JMA declared Kinna an extratropical cyclone early on September 14, with the JTWC doing the same several hours later. Its extratropical remnants were last witnessed on the evening of September 16 by the JMA.

== Impact ==
Typhoon Kinna dropped heavy rainfall across much of the southern Japanese archipelago, with many places across the southwestern portion of the country receiving almost 150 mm (6 in) of rain per hour. A peak rainfall total of 338 mm (13.3 in) occurred at Nanbu, including 330 mm (13 in) in a 24-hour time frame. A peak hourly rainfall total of 147 mm (5.8 in) was observed in Maebaru. Further south, much of Okinawa received at least 200 mm (8 in) of precipitation. When the storm passed through southern Okinawa, a minimum surface pressure of 958 mbar (28.3 inHg) was measured at Kadena Air Base, where sustained winds of 152 km/h (94 mph) and gusts of 177 km/h (110 mph) were also recorded. Nearby, winds gusting up to 175 km/h (109 mph) occurred in Naha. Near where the storm made landfall, winds of 151 km/h (94 mph) were measured in Maebaru.

As a result of the JTWC's accurate long-range forecasts, preparations to limit the amount of damage on Okinawa were made well in advance of Kinna's approach. Despite the strong winds, damage to United States military installations on Okinawa was minimal. Nevertheless, Kinna was the most destructive tropical cyclone to strike Okinawa since 1987, and the first of typhoon intensity to pass directly across the island since Typhoon Vera in 1986. A 14-year-old middle school student was slightly injured due to broken glass. All morning flights from Naha were canceled and afternoon flights were delayed. Offshore, a boat capsized, which left one fisherman dead and two others initially missing. Prefecture-wide, two people were hurt and power lines were downed in 571 places. Damage was assessed at ¥791 million.

On Shikoku Island, roads were cut in 16 places in Tokushima Prefecture. Two landslides occurred in Susaki. Crop damage in Kōchi Prefecture amounted to ¥2.86 billion, where roads were damaged in 116 places. A total of 7,907 individuals lost their homes in Ehime Prefecture. There, authorities estimated that damage totaled to ¥615 million. On the island of Kyushu, 210 homes were damaged in Kagoshima Prefecture. Damage there was estimated at ¥626 million. In the city of Kumamoto, a motorcyclist died after gusty winds knocked him off his bike. Throughout the surrounding Kumamoto Prefecture, damage exceeded ¥2 billion. Two people were killed in Nagasaki Prefecture when heavy rains flooded a barn while fifteen other people were also hurt. Moreover, 40 homes were damaged in the prefecture, displacing 40. Five people suffered injuries in Oita Prefecture. Strong winds caused power outages to 19,000 dwellings. Damage there was estimated at ¥1.55 billion. A mudslide destroyed a farm in Saga Prefecture, killing one man. Twenty others were also injured. A total of 58 homes were damaged and nine others were destroyed. Damage in the prefecture amounted to ¥28.1 billion. In Fukuoka Prefecture, two people were killed by flying debris. There, 25 other individuals were injured. A total of 1,221 homes were damaged and 440 were destroyed while 9 embankments and 9 bridges were also damaged. There were 149 landslides. One electrical transmission tower was damaged, with two others destroyed. Damage across Fukuoka Prefecture amounted to ¥22.8 billion.

Heavy rains in Wakayama Prefecture damaged three houses. Around 1,000 households in Osaka Prefecture were left without power due to strong winds. Two people were wounded in Okayama Prefecture, where 506 schools were closed and 50 trains were cancelled. A senior woman died after a tree collapsed while she was waiting for a bus stop in Hiroshima Prefecture while three others were also injured. Strong winds caused 16,700 customers to lose power and 279 schools were closed in the prefecture. A total of 35 homes were damaged and another was demolished. Offshore, 114 ships were damaged. Officials estimate that damage in Hiroshima Prefecture amounted to ¥1.27 billion. A 75-year-old man in Mikawa drowned in a river. Three people were seriously injured and twelve others were slightly injured in nearby Ogata. Heavy rains caused flooding, which damaged 53 homes were damaged, and 11 others were partially leveled in Yamaguchi Prefecture. There were 522 blackouts in the prefecture. Damage was estimated at ¥8 billion. Furthermore, 4,425 homes were left without power in Tottori prefecture. One person was wounded in Shimane Prefecture due to flying glass. A total of 245 houses were damaged and 137 others were destroyed. Damage there totaled 985 million yen. Ten homes were damaged in Gifu Prefecture. Officials estimated that damage there reached ¥1.26 billion.

Nationwide, 11 fatalities were reported and 94 others sustained injuries. Nearly 50,000 households were left without power. Most of the damage occurred on Kyushu and on western Honshu. Almost 150 domestic flights were cancelled, which left 26,000 travelers stranded. A total of 382 houses were destroyed while 2,586 others were flooded. Heavy rains triggered two hundred thirteen landslides and flooding washed out nine bridges. Forty-seven roads were damaged. Overall, 69 ships as well as 875 ha (2,160 acres) of farmland were damaged. Monetary damage totaled ¥51.1 billion ($383 million). (Note: All currencies are converted from Japanese yen to United States Dollars using this with an exchange rate of the year 1991.) (Note: All damage totals are in 1991 values of their respective currencies.)

== See also ==
- Typhoon Zola (1990) - similar mid-season typhoon that struck Japan a year prior
