= Typhoon Irma (1966) =

Pacific typhoon in 1966

Typhoon Irma (Klaring)
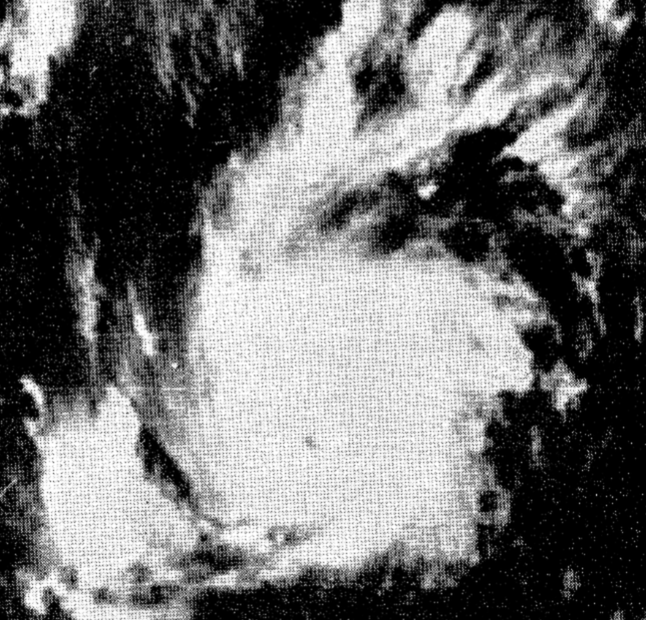
- Typhoon Irma

Meteorological history
- Formed: May 10, 1966
- Dissipated: May 22, 1966

Unknown-strength storm
- 10-minute sustained (JMA)
- Lowest pressure: 970 hPa (mbar); 28.64 inHg

Category 4-equivalent typhoon
- 1-minute sustained (SSHWS/JTWC)
- Highest winds: 220 km/h (140 mph)
- Lowest pressure: 970 hPa (mbar); 28.64 inHg

Overall effects
- Fatalities: 174 total
- Damage: $2.5 million (1966 USD)
- Areas affected: Philippines
- Part of the 1966 Pacific typhoon season

Typhoon Irma, known in the Philippines as Typhoon Klaring was a typhoon that hit the Philippines in May 1966.

== Meteorological history ==
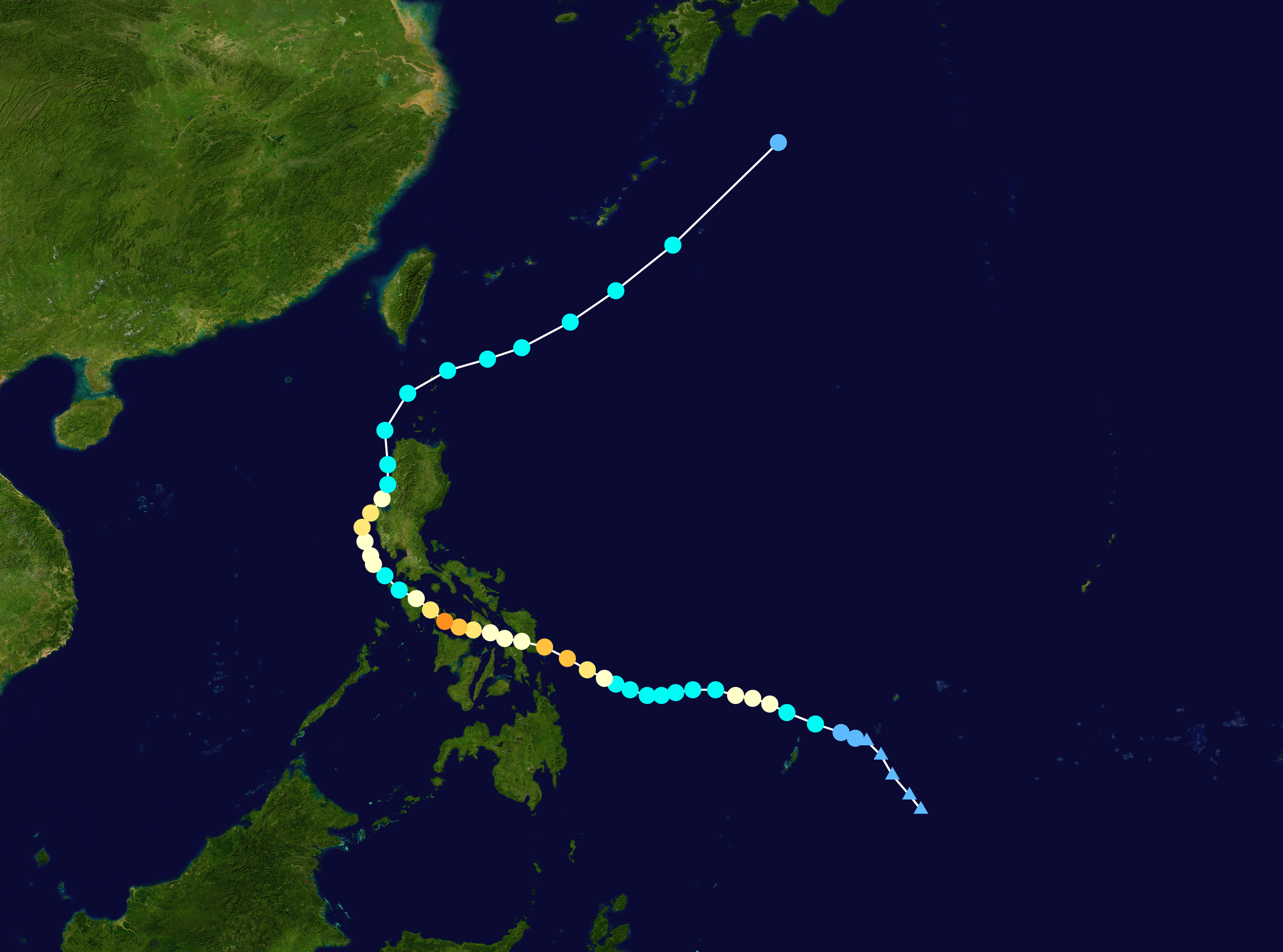
Map plotting the storm's track and intensity, according to the Saffir–Simpson scale Map key Saffir–Simpson scale Tropical depression (≤38 mph, ≤62 km/h) Tropical storm (39–73 mph, 63–118 km/h) Category 1 (74–95 mph, 119–153 km/h) Category 2 (96–110 mph, 154–177 km/h) Category 3 (111–129 mph, 178–208 km/h) Category 4 (130–156 mph, 209–251 km/h) Category 5 (≥157 mph, ≥252 km/h) Unknown Storm type Tropical cyclone Subtropical cyclone Extratropical cyclone, remnant low, tropical disturbance, or monsoon depression

115 mph Typhoon Irma hit the eastern Samar on May 15. It weakened over the island, but re-intensified rapidly to a 140 mph typhoon in the Sibuyan Sea before hitting Mindoro on the 17th. After weakening to a tropical storm, Irma turned northward to hit western Luzon as a 95 mph typhoon on the 19th. It accelerated to the northeast, and became extratropical on the 22nd. The extratropical remnant raced northeast before abruptly slowing on May 23 well to the east of Japan. During that time, it temporarily turned north while moving erratically. The system later acquired a general eastward track by May 26 and accelerated once more before dissipating near the International Dateline on May 29.

== Impact ==
Severe damage took place across the Philippines, with Leyte suffering the brunt of Irma's impact. Twenty people lost their lives across the country. Preliminary reports indicated that Tacloban incurred $2.5 million in damage. A gasoline explosion near Manila that killed 12 people and injured 18 others was partially attributed to the typhoon. On May 17, the 740 ton vessel Pioneer Cebu sailed directly into the storm over the Visayan Sea off the coast of Malapascua Island after ignoring warnings to remain at port. Carrying 262 people, the ship struck a reef while battling rough seas in the typhoon. Passengers began abandoning the sinking vessel soon thereafter under the captain's orders while message about the ship's sinking was relayed by the radio operator. A large wave then struck the ship on its side, capsizing and submerging it entirely. Of the passengers and crew, 122 went down with the ship, including captain Floro Yap, while 140 managed to escape. Rescue operations lasted nearly two days, with many of the survivors being stranded in shark infested waters for upwards of 40 hours. Of the survivors, 130 were picked up by a rescue ship while 10 others were found on nearby islands. Only five bodies were recovered in the area while the rest were presumed to be lost with the ship in an area referred to as the "graveyard of ships." A trading vessel, the Banca Alex, also sank off the coast of Cebu with 80 people aboard; 60 were later rescued while 20 others were never found.
