= Typhoon Kelly =

Pacific typhoon in 1987

Typhoon Kelly (Oniang)
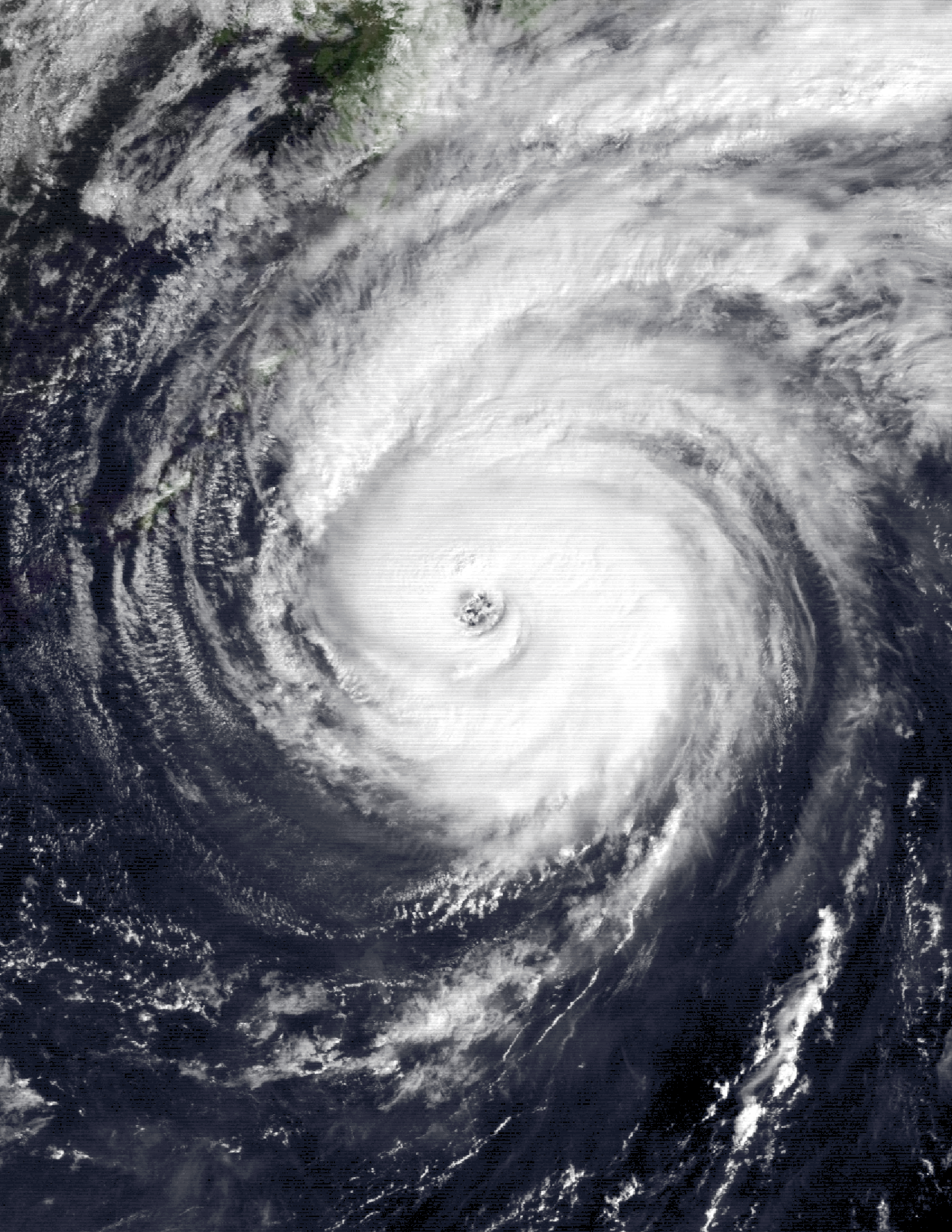
- Typhoon Kelly early on October 15

Meteorological history
- Formed: October 9, 1987
- Dissipated: October 17, 1987

Typhoon
- 10-minute sustained (JMA)
- Highest winds: 140 km/h (85 mph)
- Lowest pressure: 955 hPa (mbar); 28.20 inHg

Category 2-equivalent typhoon
- 1-minute sustained (SSHWS/JTWC)
- Highest winds: 175 km/h (110 mph)
- Lowest pressure: 950 hPa (mbar); 28.05 inHg

Overall effects
- Fatalities: 9 total
- Damage: $366 million (1987 USD)
- Areas affected: Japan
- IBTrACS
- Part of the 1987 Pacific typhoon season

Typhoon Kelly, known as Typhoon Oniang in the Philippines, struck Japan during the middle of October 1987. An area of disturbed weather formed along the monsoon trough near Yap on October 6. Although thunderstorm activity was initially displaced from the center, gradual development occurred nevertheless. The disturbance became a tropical depression on October 9, and a tropical storm the next day. While moving generally north-northwest towards Japan, Kelly attained typhoon intensity on October 12. Continuing to intensify, Typhoon Kelly reached its maximum intensity on October 15, but a weakening trend began thereafter. The next day, the typhoon passed over the islands of Shikoku and Honshu. By October 17, Kelly completed its transition into an extratropical cyclone.

Across Japan, the typhoon was responsible for 452 landslides, 20 destroyed bridges, and 165 damaged roads. A total of 216 homes were destroyed, 24,044 houses were flooded, 99 ships were damaged, and 6,802 hectares (16,810 acres) of farmland were damaged. The typhoon killed nine and injured seventeen others. Damage amounted to $365.6 million (1987 USD).

== Meteorological history ==
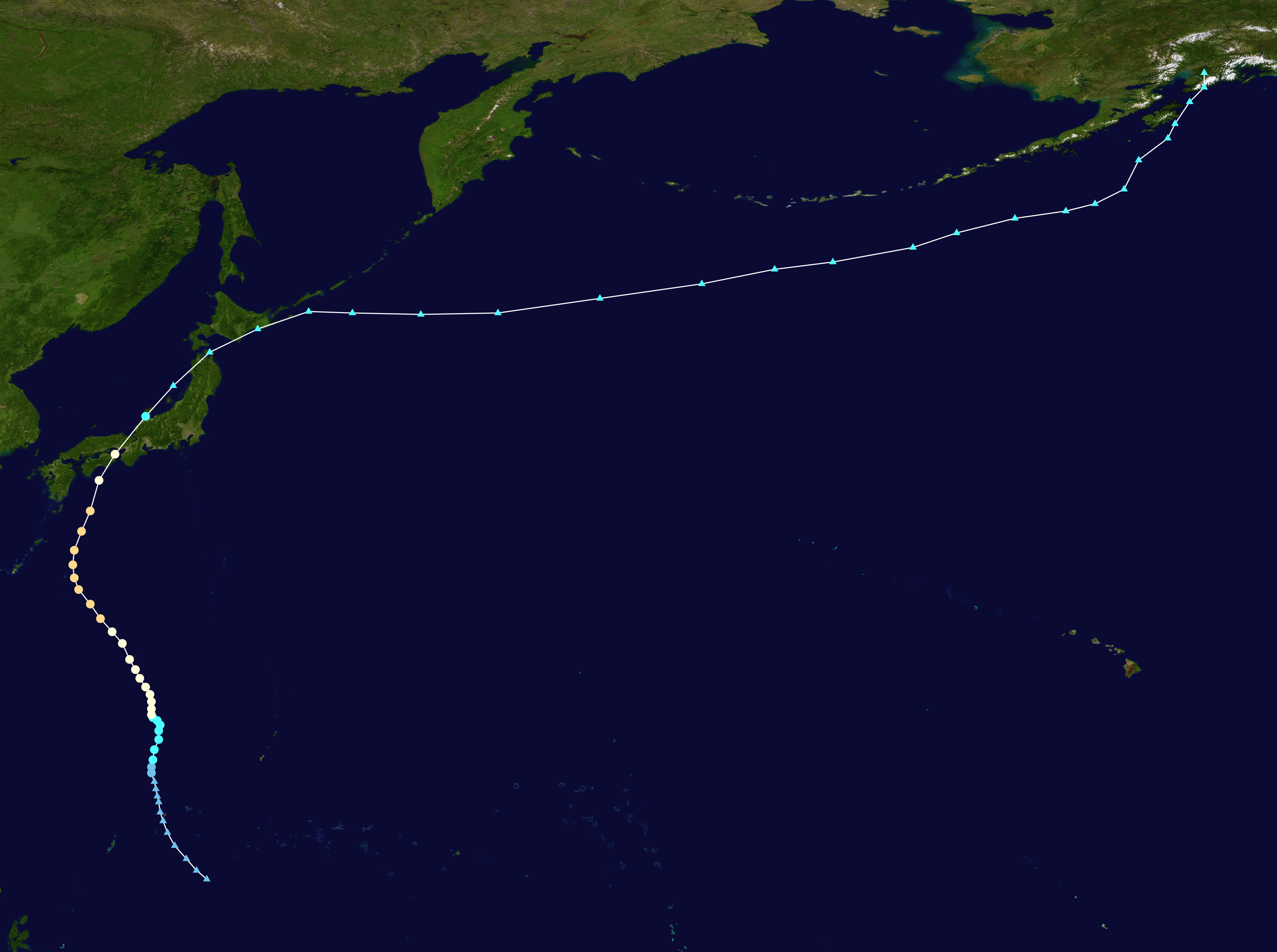
Map plotting the storm's track and intensity, according to the Saffir–Simpson scale Map key Saffir–Simpson scale Tropical depression (≤38 mph, ≤62 km/h) Tropical storm (39–73 mph, 63–118 km/h) Category 1 (74–95 mph, 119–153 km/h) Category 2 (96–110 mph, 154–177 km/h) Category 3 (111–129 mph, 178–208 km/h) Category 4 (130–156 mph, 209–251 km/h) Category 5 (≥157 mph, ≥252 km/h) Unknown Storm type Tropical cyclone Subtropical cyclone Extratropical cyclone, remnant low, tropical disturbance, or monsoon depression

Following multiple outbreaks of tropical cyclone activity across the Western Pacific basin in September 1987, a large ridge developed at unusually low latitudes of the basin, forcing the Intertropical Convergence Zone further south and making environmental conditions unfavorable for tropical cyclone formation. On October 6, the monsoon trough began to re-establish itself around the 5th parallel north as the ridge receded northward. The next day, satellite imagery indicated that a low-pressure area embedded in the monsoon trough developed 350 km (215 mi) south of Yap. Although shower activity was initially displaced to the north of the low, the Joint Typhoon Warning Center (JTWC) issued a Tropical Cyclone Formation Alert for the system, on the basis of increased circus outflow. Around this time, the Japan Meteorological Agency (JMA) upgraded the system into a tropical depression. (Note: The Japan Meteorological Agency is the official Regional Specialized Meteorological Center for the western Pacific Ocean.) Within 24 hours of the issuance of the TCFA, thunderstorm activity gradually increased in coverage, and the JTWC upgraded the disturbance into a tropical depression at 00:00 UTC on October 10, although post-season analysis from the JTWC indicated that this occurred six hours earlier than operationally estimated. Despite a 100 km (60 mi) displacement between the surface and upper-level circulations, the JTWC upgraded the depression into a tropical storm at 12:00 UTC. Six hours later, the JMA followed suit. (Note: Wind estimates from the JMA and most other basins throughout the world are sustained over 10 minutes, while estimates from the United States-based Joint Typhoon Warning Center are sustained over 1 minute. 10-minute winds are about 1.14 times the amount of 1-minute winds.)

While moving north, the low-and upper-level centers of Kelly became better aligned on October 11, which resulted in strengthening. At 18:00 UTC, Kelly was upgraded into a severe tropical storm by the JMA. Six hours later, the JTWC reported that Kelly attained typhoon intensity. Meanwhile, the Philippine Atmospheric, Geophysical and Astronomical Services Administration (PAGASA) also began to monitor the storm, with the agency assigning it the local name Oniang. At 12:00 UTC on October 12, the JMA followed suit and classified the storm as a typhoon. Twelve hours later, the JMA raised the intensity to 135 km/h (85 mph), its peak intensity. After maintaining maximum intensity for 72 hours, the storm's forwards motion started to decrease, and on October 15, the typhoon turned to the north-northwest despite being forecast to recruve out to sea in response to a trough located over the Yellow Sea. At midday, the JTWC increased the intensity of Kelly to 175 km/h (110 mph), equal to Category 2 status on the United States-based Saffir–Simpson hurricane wind scale, and its peak intensity. On October 16, Kelly began to lose tropical characteristics and transition into an extratropical cyclone. Later that day, the storm passed over Shikoku and then made landfall near Kobe while maintaining typhoon intensity. Kelly then emerged into the Sea of Japan, and at 06:00 UTC on October 17, the JTWC declared the system an extratropical cyclone. The JMA did the same six hours later, but continued to track the system through October 19.

== Impact ==
The typhoon dropped heavy rainfall over much of Japan, with a maximum of 688 mm (27.1 in) in Shikano, including 580 mm (23 in) in a 24-hour span. Yanase Dam received 103 mm (4.1 in) of rain in an hour, the highest hourly rainfall total measured during the storm. A peak wind gust of 77 km/h (48 mph) was recorded in Murotomisaki. A total of 84 domestic flights were cancelled, including 36 flights on 16 routes to and from the Osaka International Airport. Four people died in the prefecture of Tottori when landslides swept their homes. Three other people were killed in Kagawa Prefecture, located on the island of Shikoku, because of flying debris. Offshore, a 12,346 short tons (11,200 t) freighter, the Eleftheria II, was badly damaged when it slammed onto rocks off the coast of Shikoku, where its 24 crewmen were rescued.

Overall, nine people were killed and seventeen people were wounded. Based on reports from the National Police Agency, Typhoon Kelly caused 452 landslides, demolished 20 bridges, damaged 165 dwellings, and damaged railways in 20 prefectures. Nationwide, 24,044 houses were flooded, 216 homes were destroyed, and additional 30 homes were badly damaged. A total of 99 ships along with 6,802 ha (16,810 acres) of farmland were damaged. Damage amounted to $365.6 million. (Note: All currencies are converted from Japanese yen to United States Dollars using this with an exchange rate of the year 1987.)

== See also ==
- Typhoon Dinah (1987)
