= Tropical Storm Koguma (2021) =

Pacific tropical storm in 2021

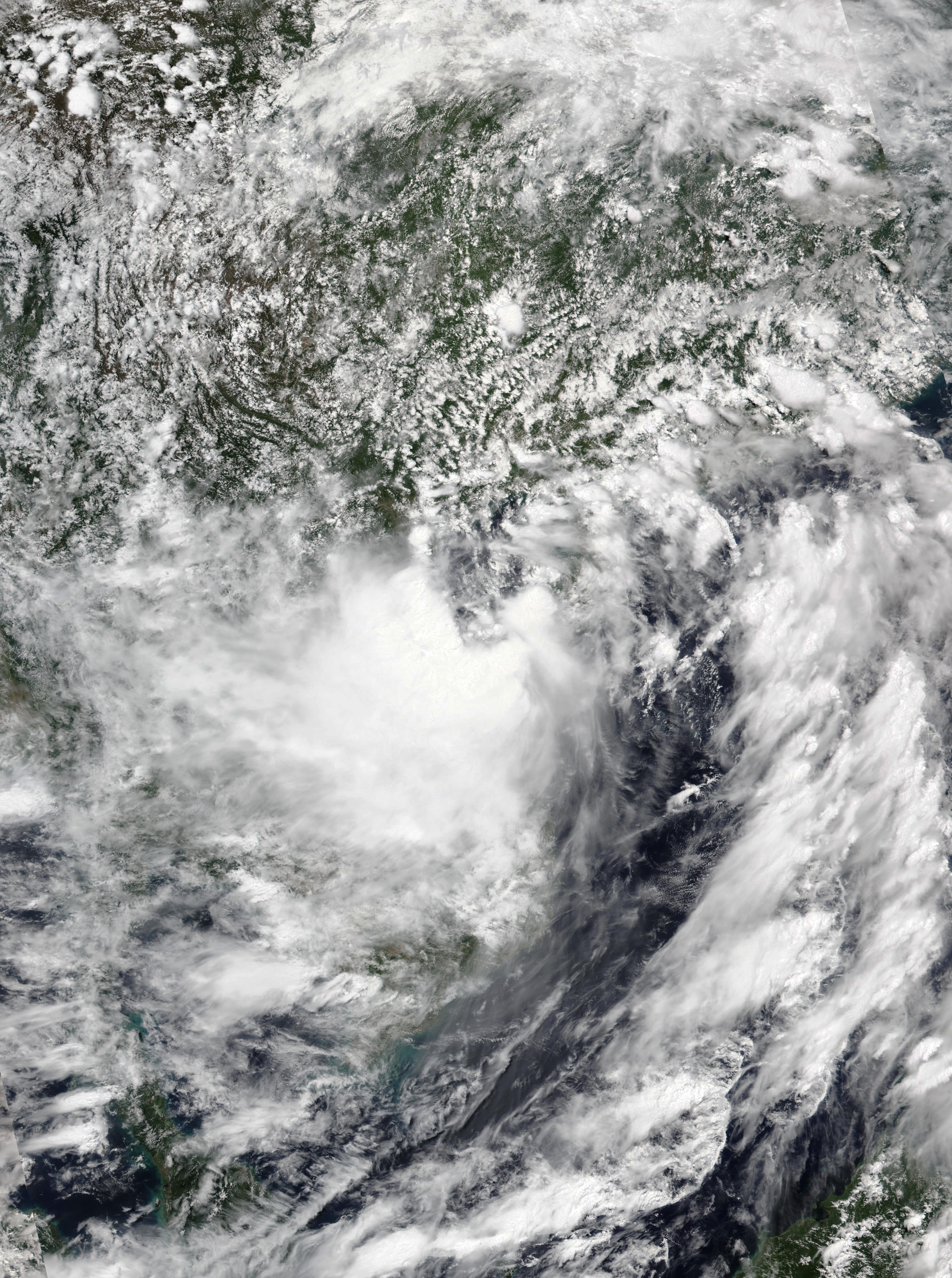
- Tropical Storm Koguma at peak intensity over the Gulf of Tonkin on June 12

Meteorological history
- Formed: June 11, 2021
- Dissipated: June 13, 2021

Tropical storm
- 10-minute sustained (JMA)
- Highest winds: 65 km/h (40 mph)
- Lowest pressure: 996 hPa (mbar); 29.41 inHg

Tropical storm
- 1-minute sustained (SSHWS/JTWC)
- Highest winds: 65 km/h (40 mph)
- Lowest pressure: 996 hPa (mbar); 29.41 inHg

Overall effects
- Fatalities: 1
- Missing: 2
- Damage: $12.9 million (2021 USD)
- Areas affected: South China, Vietnam and Indochina
- IBTrACS
- Part of the 2021 Pacific typhoon season

Tropical Storm Koguma (Note: The name Koguma (Japanese: コグマ, [ko̞ɡɯ̟ma̠]) was contributed by Japan and refers to the constellation Ursa Minor, the bear cub, in Japanese.) was a weak tropical cyclone that made landfall in Vietnam, causing minor damage in mid June 2021. The fourth named storm of the 2021 Pacific typhoon season, the system was first noted as an area of persistent convection on the South China Sea on June 10, with the JTWC assessing the system in its first advisory as a monsoon depression. Tracking west-northwestward, marginally conductive environmental conditions in the area allowed slight intensification while drifting towards Hainan Island. On the next day, the JMA upgraded the system to a tropical depression as it passed to the south of the territory before the agency upgraded the system to a tropical storm on June 12, being assigned the name Koguma, the replacement name for Koppu. The JTWC; however still treated the system as a tropical depression until 12:00 UTC that day. It continued to move northwest over the warm waters of the Gulf of Tonkin, eventually making landfall in Vietnam over Thanh Hóa by the end of the same day, rapidly weakening afterward.

Koguma caused widespread floods in Vietnam and Laos, being influenced by the prevailing southwest monsoon. Trees and electrical lines in the former were downed by strong winds, while numerous landslides and rivers being overflowed due to rains were confirmed in the latter. Two individuals in Thanh Hóa were reported to be missing due to the storm, while an individual in Yên Bái Province was confirmed dead by the Vietnam Disaster Management Authority, though their exact cause of death is unknown. Preliminary damages in Vietnam were at 70.6 billion VND (US$3.08 million) while in Xayaboury stood at ₭94 billion (US$9.77 million).

== Meteorological history ==
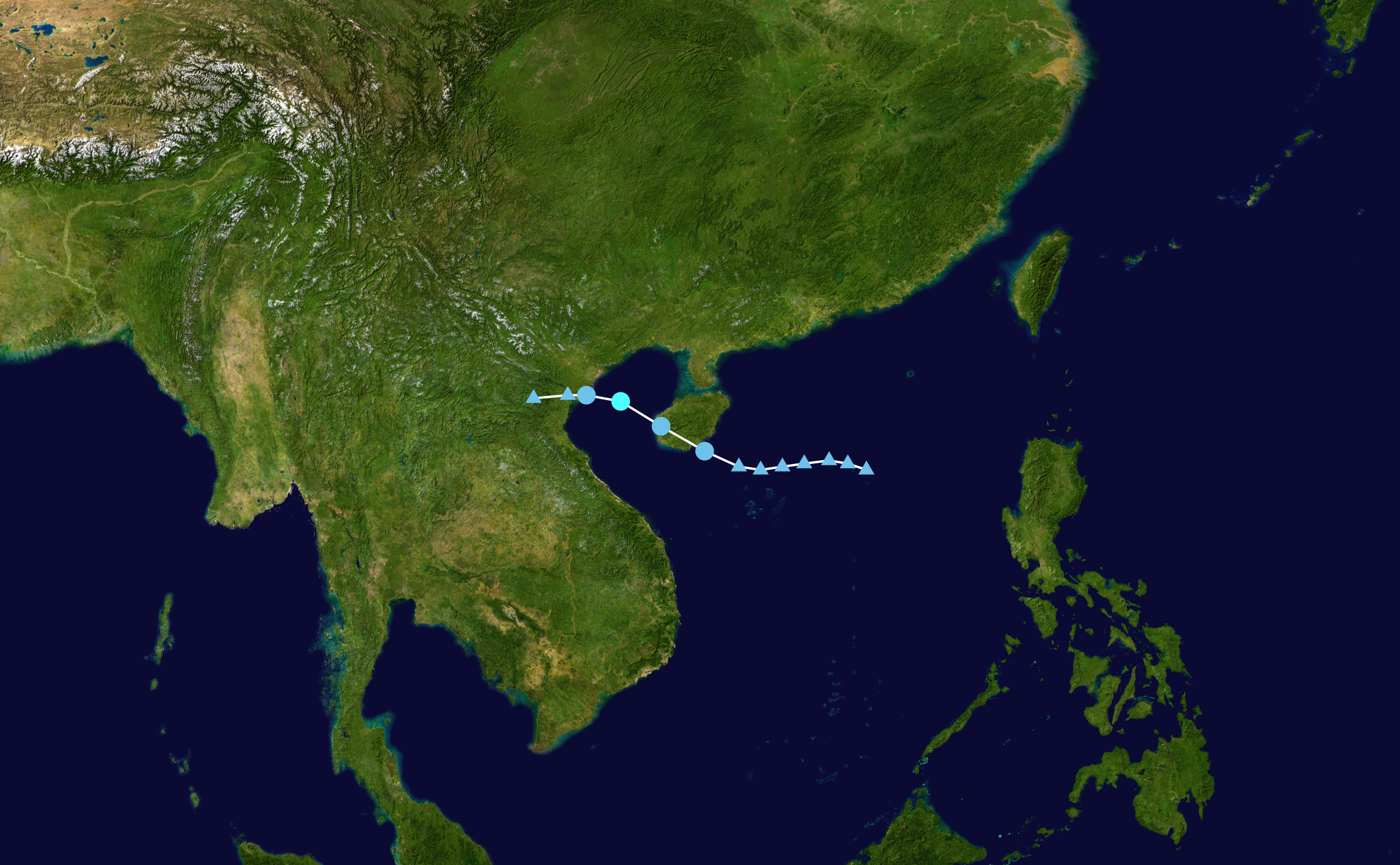
Map plotting the storm's track and intensity, according to the Saffir–Simpson scale Map key Saffir–Simpson scale Tropical depression (≤38 mph, ≤62 km/h) Tropical storm (39–73 mph, 63–118 km/h) Category 1 (74–95 mph, 119–153 km/h) Category 2 (96–110 mph, 154–177 km/h) Category 3 (111–129 mph, 178–208 km/h) Category 4 (130–156 mph, 209–251 km/h) Category 5 (≥157 mph, ≥252 km/h) Unknown Storm type Tropical cyclone Subtropical cyclone Extratropical cyclone, remnant low, tropical disturbance, or monsoon depression

At 8:30 UTC on June 10, the Joint Typhoon Warning Center (JTWC) (Note: The Joint Typhoon Warning Center is a joint United States Navy – United States Air Force task force that issues tropical cyclone warnings for the western Pacific Ocean and other regions.) started to monitor a low-pressure area in the South China Sea, located approximately 518 km (322 mi) to the south of Hong Kong, with the agency classifying the system as a monsoon depression as it was embedded within a monsoon trough that extends from Laos to the Philippines. Tracking west-northwestward, the storm was located in a favorable environment for tropical cyclogenesis, with warm sea surface temperatures up to 30–31 °C (86–88 °F) and low wind shear, being offset by the lack of divergence aloft in the area. At 06:00 UTC on June 11, the Japan Meteorological Agency (JMA) (Note: The Japan Meteorological Agency is the official Regional Specialized Meteorological Center for the western Pacific Ocean.) upgraded the system into a tropical depression in its first advisory. An anticyclone over China started to move eastward at this time, increasing the divergent flow on the area which allowed slight intensification of the system. The JTWC issued a Tropical Cyclone Formation Alert (TCFA) for the system, six hours later despite remaining disorganized on satellite imagery. At 03:00 UTC on June 12, the JTWC upgraded the system into a tropical depression, assigning it the designation 05W. At this time, the system passed over southern Hainan Island, into an area of moderate wind shear, which hampered the system's intensification. Three hours later at 06:00 UTC, the JMA assessed the system to have strengthened to a tropical storm, being assigned the name Koguma. Six hours later, the JTWC upgraded the system to the same intensity as well as it entered the Gulf of Tonkin. Remaining weak, Koguma moved northwestward and subsequently made landfall over north-central Thanh Hóa at 18:00 UTC on the same day, at peak intensity with winds of 65 km/h (40 mph) and a barometric pressure of 996 mbar. The JTWC issued their final warning on the weakening system shortly afterward. At 15:45 UTC on June 13, the JMA also issued the final warning on Koguma as it weakened further to a tropical depression and subsequently dissipated over the terrains of Vietnam.

== Preparations ==
=== Vietnam ===
As Koguma approached Vietnam from the Gulf of Tonkin, the city of Thái Bình ordered the suspension of fishing activities in the area due to the forecasted rough waters from the storm. Many farmers in the place also hurried to harvest the spring rice crops to prevent them from being destroyed and flooded. The People's Committee of the city, on the other hand, urged the individuals in the area to cut the trees that would disrupt major roadways and put support on their houses, warehouses, schools, hospitals, aquaculture and fishing farms to prevent any damages. Evacuations in the area and its nearby cities and provinces were also ordered. Moderate to heavy rainfall were also expected in the northern portions of the country, with 50–120 mm (2−4 in) of rain being forecasted in these areas, including Hanoi. In addition, the country's capital also prepared a flood response plan inland and informed 54,673 vehicles in the sea of possible impacts from Koguma.

=== Elsewhere ===
At 13:00 UTC on June 11, the Hong Kong Observatory in Hong Kong issued a Signal Number 1 in the region due to Koguma, which was subsequently cancelled on 16:30 UTC, the next day. The Ministry of Water Resources in Cambodia raised an alert warning on the country due to the possible effects of Koguma, being influenced by the prevailing southwest monsoon. The ministry also advised fishermen across the country to be alerted of large waves, gusty winds, and prevalent thunderstorms. Authorities in Laos informed the people in the country to be alert on floods caused by the prevailing monsoon and the remnants of Koguma. The Thai Meteorological Department noted that moderate to heavy rainfall were expected across some places in Northern and Northeastern portions of Thailand due to the influence of the monsoon trough and the remnants of the system.

== Impact ==
=== Vietnam ===
Koguma making landfall in Vietnam on June 12.

Koguma caused heavy downpours across northern Vietnam. 321 mm (12.6 in) of rainfall were recorded at Dau Lieu, Hà Tĩnh Province on June 13, while an amount of 240 mm (9.4 in) were reported at Vinh, Nghệ An Province on the same day.

A tornado swept through An Vu commune in the rural district of Quỳnh Phụ District on June 13, causing the roofs of some schools in the area to be blown away by strong winds. These conditions also caused several trees in the district and in Haiphong to be uprooted while four power poles in the former had been reported to be depleted due to the storm. In the latter, heavy rains from Koguma caused many rivers to nearly overflow. Initial impacts caused by the storm in An Vũ topped at 2.4 billion VND (US$105,000). 2 people in Thanh Hóa's coast were reported missing, while an individual was confirmed dead in Yên Bái Province on June 14 by the Vietnam Disaster Management Authority due to Koguma. A total of 143 houses throughout Vietnam were damaged. Over 19,720 hectares of farmland were also submerged in floodwaters while 850 individuals throughout the country were affected due to the storm. Total damage in Vietnam reached 70.6 billion VND (US$3.08 million).

=== Laos ===
Despite Koguma dissipating over Vietnam, the remnants of the storm reached Laos, causing numerous landslides and floods. Residences and farmlands were the worst impacted in Vientiane, Xayaboury, Xiangkhouang and Bokeo due to the storm, being influenced further by the monsoon. Houses in Pha Oudom District, located in Bokeo Province were reported to be washed away by the floodwaters while several landslides disrupted roadways in Xiengkhouang's Khoune District. Local authorities in the country also issued warnings on individuals residing in different rivers across the country due to the rising water levels. In addition, the Nam Houng River and Nam Song River overflowed on June 14, with the former flooding the ricefields near the watercourse. Over 3,000 individuals in Sainyabuli, on the other hand, were affected by the floods. The damages in the country are still tallied as of June 16. 5,300 public vehicles and 11 schools were reported to be damaged by the floods, while five bridges throughout the country were wrecked. In addition, 25 roadways were impassable as they were destroyed; some of them were now repaired as of June 17. An estimated 169 hectares of plowland were severely affected by the floods and an unknown number of poultry and cattle perished due to the storm. No deaths were confirmed in the country and the damages in Xayaboury, the worst hit, stood at ₭94 billion (US$9.77 million).

== See also ==
- Weather of 2021
- Tropical cyclones in 2021
- Tropical Storm Zita (1997) – A short-lived tropical cyclone that killed seven people throughout southern China in August 1997.
- Tropical Storm Bebinca (2013) – A tropical cyclone brought minor damage in China and Vietnam, causing a death.
- Tropical Storm Sinlaku (2020) – A weak but deadly tropical cyclone that impacted Vietnam, Thailand and Laos in August 2020.
- Tropical Storm Linfa (2020) - A weak storm that contributed to devastating floods in Central Vietnam
- Tropical Storm Nangka (2020) – the 4th wettest tropical cyclone on record.
