= Tropical Storm Choi-wan (2021) =

Pacific tropical storm in 2021

Tropical Storm Choi-wan (Dante)
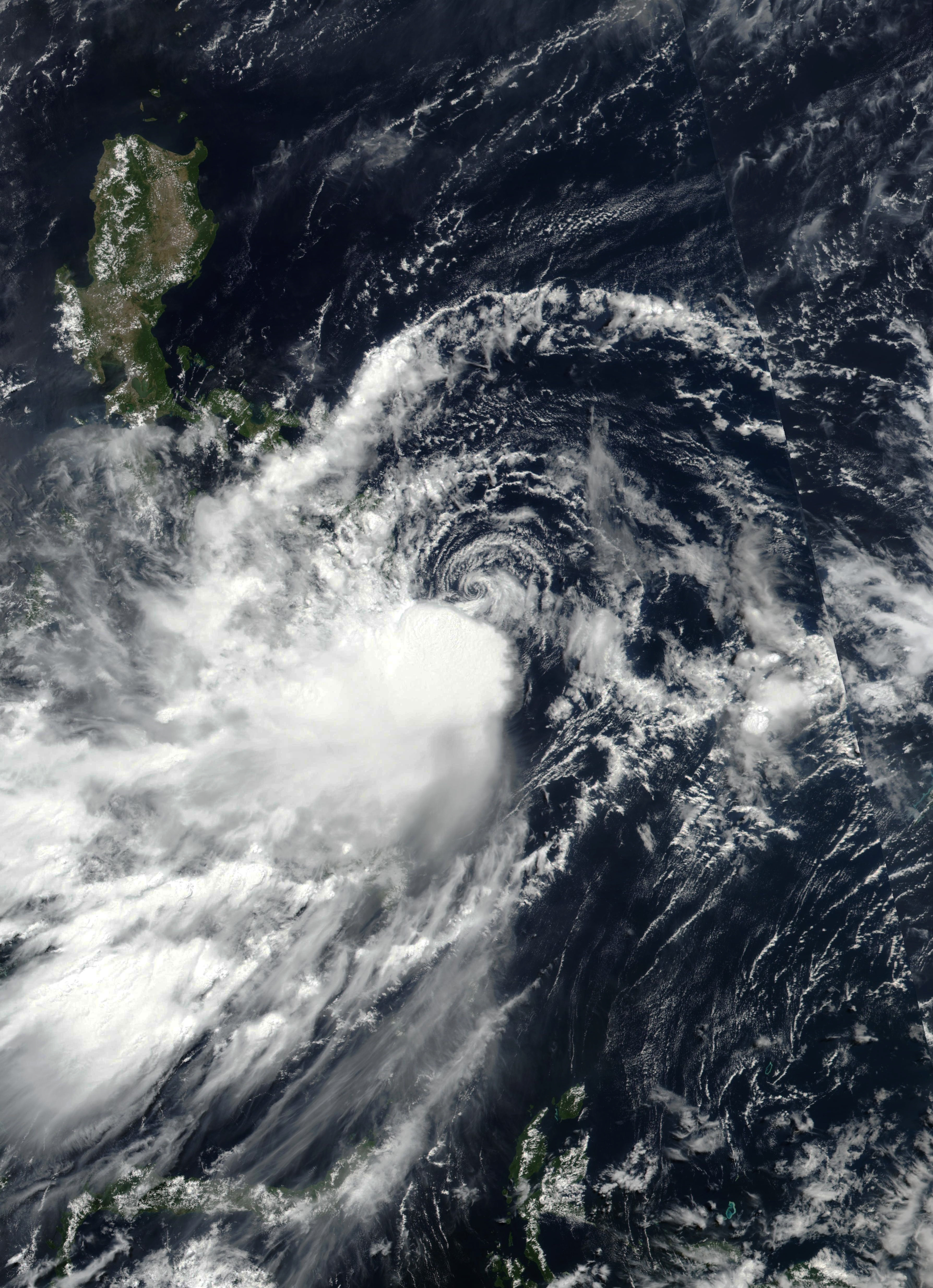
- Tropical Storm Choi-wan nearing landfall in Eastern Samar on June 1

Meteorological history
- Formed: May 29, 2021
- Extratropical: June 5, 2021
- Dissipated: June 6, 2021

Tropical storm
- 10-minute sustained (JMA)
- Highest winds: 75 km/h (45 mph)
- Lowest pressure: 998 hPa (mbar); 29.47 inHg

Tropical storm
- 1-minute sustained (SSHWS/JTWC)
- Highest winds: 85 km/h (50 mph)
- Lowest pressure: 996 hPa (mbar); 29.41 inHg

Overall effects
- Fatalities: 11
- Missing: 2
- Damage: $6.39 million (2021 USD)
- Areas affected: Palau, Philippines, Taiwan, Japan
- IBTrACS
- Part of the 2021 Pacific typhoon season

Tropical Storm Choi-wan, known in the Philippines as Tropical Storm Dante, was a tropical storm which caused moderate flooding and damage in the Philippines and also affected Taiwan in late May and early June 2021. The third named storm of the 2021 Pacific typhoon season, Choi-wan originated from an area of low pressure, located south-southeast of Guam near a brewing system. Fueled by an environment favorable for tropical cyclogenesis, it developed into a tropical depression, two days later as it moved westward. At 00:00 UTC on May 31, the system strengthened to a tropical storm and was named Choi-wan by the JMA. Although the storm was still located in the conductive conditions off the Philippine Sea while moving northwestward, a tropical upper tropospheric trough to the northeast halted the system's intensification, with Choi-wan's convection displaced to the south of its circulation on satellite imagery.

Heavy rains caused floods across a majority of Mindanao and Visayas; 11 fatalities were reported and 2 people are missing. In the southwestern Philippines, 45,000 people were impacted while more than 12,000 sheltered at evacuation centers to ride out the cyclone. In Western Visayas, 895 people were also evacuated on June 2. Around 4,813 individuals were displaced in Agusan del Norte.

== Meteorological history ==
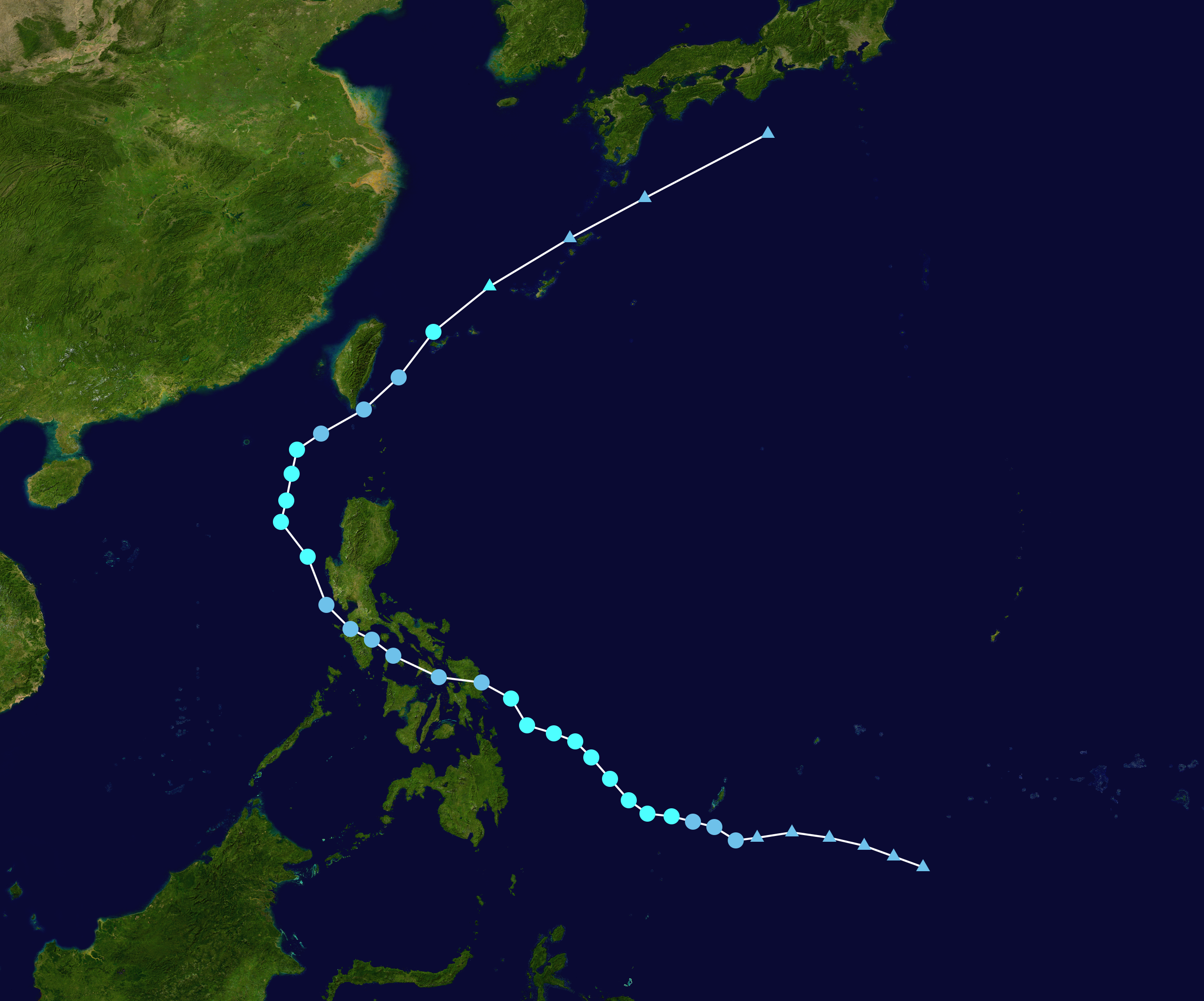
Map plotting the storm's track and intensity, according to the Saffir–Simpson scale Map key Saffir–Simpson scale Tropical depression (≤38 mph, ≤62 km/h) Tropical storm (39–73 mph, 63–118 km/h) Category 1 (74–95 mph, 119–153 km/h) Category 2 (96–110 mph, 154–177 km/h) Category 3 (111–129 mph, 178–208 km/h) Category 4 (130–156 mph, 209–251 km/h) Category 5 (≥157 mph, ≥252 km/h) Unknown Storm type Tropical cyclone Subtropical cyclone Extratropical cyclone, remnant low, tropical disturbance, or monsoon depression

On May 27, the Japan Meteorological Agency (JMA) and the Joint Typhoon Warning Center (JTWC) noted the persistence of an area of atmospheric convection about 425 nautical miles (787 km; 489 mi) south-southeast of Guam. The convection's nearby environment exhibited low vertical wind shear and warm 29–30 °C (84–86 °F) sea surface temperatures; ideal conditions for tropical cyclogenesis. The JMA assessed the area of convection to have developed into a tropical depression on May 29 at 06:00 UTC around 06°N 136°E. The PAGASA made a similar assessment in a Tropical Cyclone Advisory issued at 15:00 UTC. The JTWC later followed with their own assessment, identifying the center of the newly developed tropical depression approximately 35 nautical miles (65 km; 40 mi) south-southeast of Angaur, Palau and assigning the designation 04W. As the system tracked westward, it entered the Philippine Area of Responsibility at 01:00 PHT (17:00 UTC). The PAGASA then named the storm Dante in its first Tropical Cyclone Bulletin for the storm.

Choi-wan intensified further in the Philippine Sea and the JTWC had determined that the depression strengthened into a tropical storm. Later on, the Japan Meteorological Agency also upgraded the system into a tropical storm, and the storm was then named Choi-wan. (Note: The name Choi-wan (Cantonese: 彩雲, [t͡sʰɔːi˨˥ wɐn˨˩]) was contributed by Hong Kong and literally means "colorful cloud" in Cantonese.) Choi-wan's center was exposed due to a tropical upper tropospheric trough from the northeast, inducing shear on the system. The system continued to move northwestward before taking a west-northwestward track while continuing to struggle from moderate shear. At 20:30 PHT (01:30 UTC), Choi-wan struck Sulat, Eastern Samar as a minimal tropical storm. Midway through its transit through the Philippines, the JTWC then downgraded it into a tropical depression.

It then made a second landfall on the municipality of Cataingan on the island of Masbate at 17:00 UTC on June 1 before it made another landfall in Balud at 19:30 UTC, still in the province. It traversed the Sibuyan Sea then made a fourth landfall in the island of Romblon, Romblon at 00:00 UTC on the next day. It crossed the Romblon Pass before making a fifth landfall in the municipality of San Agustin, fifty minutes after the previous one, still in the province. Choi-wan then headed northwest while struggling to reorganize under the waters of the Tablas Strait, and then making a sixth landfall in Pola, Oriental Mindoro at 06:00 UTC. It traversed the island of Mindoro with the system being disorganized again before exiting into the Verde Island Passage. Choi-wan then made a seventh landfall in Marincaban Island, Tingloy, Batangas at 11:20 UTC. Continuing to move northwestward, the system made an eighth and final landfall in the Calatagan Peninsula in Batangas at 12:00 UTC on June 2 before exiting back into the South China Sea. Despite the system being predicted to dissipate in the area, warm sea surface temperatures aided Choi-wan to restrengthen to a tropical storm at 03:00 UTC on the next day.

A large high-pressure area in the central Pacific Ocean and an anticyclone over China turned the system north-northeastward, with the storm exiting the Philippine Area of Responsibility at 18:00 UTC. Dry air yet again impacted the storm, with Choi-wan's convection being displaced to the west as it approached Taiwan and as a result, the storm weakened again to a tropical depression per the estimates of the JTWC and the PAGASA. At 08:00 UTC on June 4, Choi-wan reentered the PAR before the system started to merge with an existing meiyu front which extends from China to the Japanese Islands and at the same time, passing to the south of Taiwan. At 1:00 UTC, the system re-exited the PAR for the second and final time as it headed north-northeastward. While passing through the Ryukyu Islands, the JMA issued their final warning on Choi-wan as it transitioned to an extratropical storm as it was still embedded in the front.

== Preparations and impact ==
=== Philippines ===
As Choi-wan (known locally as Dante) approached the Philippines, Tropical Cyclone Warning Signal (TCWS) #1 was issued in most of Luzon, the Visayas and Mindanao on May 31. The next day, as Dante came closer to landfall, TCWS #2 was issued across a stretch of the eastern Philippines extending northward from Biliran and Samar to Quezon. Before the landfalls of Choi-wan, the NDRRMC conducted a risk assessment for the approaching storm on May 31 while over ₱1.105 billion worth of standby funds were dispersed by the country's Social Welfare and Development department for the evacuees. The Philippine Institute of Volcanology and Seismology (PHIVOLCS), in the other hand, issued an advisory for possible lahar on June 1 for the Mayon Volcano. At least 604 people were forced to take shelter in evacuation centers in Davao City. Elsewhere, classes were suspended and workplaces closed in Sorsogon on June 1 and 2. 500 families in Agusan del Norte were forced to flee their homes as flash floods swept across the region. A total of 45,000 people were impacted in the southwestern Philippines, while 12,000 were safely evacuated. In Western Visayas, 895 people were evacuated on June 2. Within Negros Occidental, sea travel was suspended and citizens reported flooding. A preemptive evacuation were ordered on Albay's landslide, flood and lahar-prone areas on the same day. The province of Ilocos Norte in Northern Luzon were placed on heightened alert, also on the same day, following Choi-wan's approach as the storm progressed in the South China Sea.

In Mindanao, heavy rains caused flash floods and landslides from May 29 to June 1, affecting at least 2,642 people and destroying crops. Floods killed a girl and left her father missing in South Cotabato, and drowned a man in Davao del Sur. A landslide killed a baby in Davao de Oro. Damage to agriculture in Mindanao was valued at ₱14.6 million (US$305,000). A pick-up truck was swept up by floods and both of its two passengers were left missing, although they were later found alive with the truck being damaged beyond recognition. Around 4,813 citizens were displaced in Agusan del Norte from Choi-wan. Choi-wan caused ₱307.2 million in damage (US$6.39 million) to infrastructure and in the agricultural industry across both Visayas and Mindanao throughout its path on June 1–2. Choi-wan later scraped the coastline of Batangas Province in Luzon, causing minimal impact, before exiting into the coastal waters near Oriental Mindoro. 2 people, a 28-year-old man and 32-year-old woman, died in Oriental Mindoro after being struck by lightning, the man dying immediately and the woman dying on arrival to the hospital due to her injuries. A 19-year-old teen died in Occidental Mindoro after also being struck by lightning in San Jose. 11 people in total died across the Philippines, while at least 2 are still missing as of June 6.

=== Taiwan ===
The Central Weather Bureau of Taiwan issued land wind warnings across the country on June 3 as Choi-wan approached the country from the southwest. Heavy rain alerts were also issued for 15 counties as Choi-wan interacted with a front which was also delivering rainfall to the country. Roads in Greater Taipei were flooded and became impassable, while trees collapsed under the dampened soil. 234 mm (9.2 in) of rain fell in Taipei within just three hours, while an estimated 300 mm (12 in) of rain fell near the National Taiwan University. The districts of Daan, Wenshan, Nangang, Neihu, and Xinyi in Taipei all reported over 100 mm (3.9 in) of rain due to the combination of the frontal system and Choi-wan, according to Taipei Mayor Ko Wen-je. Wind warnings related to Choi-wan were lifted on June 4 as the storm weakened to a tropical depression, although rain warnings remained in effect as the unrelated frontal system continued to produce heavy rainfall.

== See also ==
- Weather of 2021
- Tropical cyclones in 2021
- Other tropical cyclones named Dante
- Other tropical cyclones named Choi-wan
- Typhoon Fengshen (2008) – Another tropical cyclone that also had severe impacts in the Philippines in June 2008.
- Typhoon Son-Tinh (2012) – A typhoon that only brought tropical storm-forced winds throughout its path in the Philippines.
- Tropical Storm Rumbia (2013) – A moderate tropical storm that brought widespread flooding in Visayas and Luzon.
- Typhoon Rammasun (2014) – An intense typhoon that left widespread damages in Southern Luzon throughout its path.
- Typhoon Vongfong (2020) – A strong tropical cyclone that impacted the Philippines in May 2020.
- Tropical Storm Nalgae (2022) – A deadly tropical storm that carved a path of destruction all over the Philippines.
- Typhoon Irma (1966) – Took a similar track.
