= Tropical Storm Sinlaku (2020) =

Pacific tropical storm in 2020

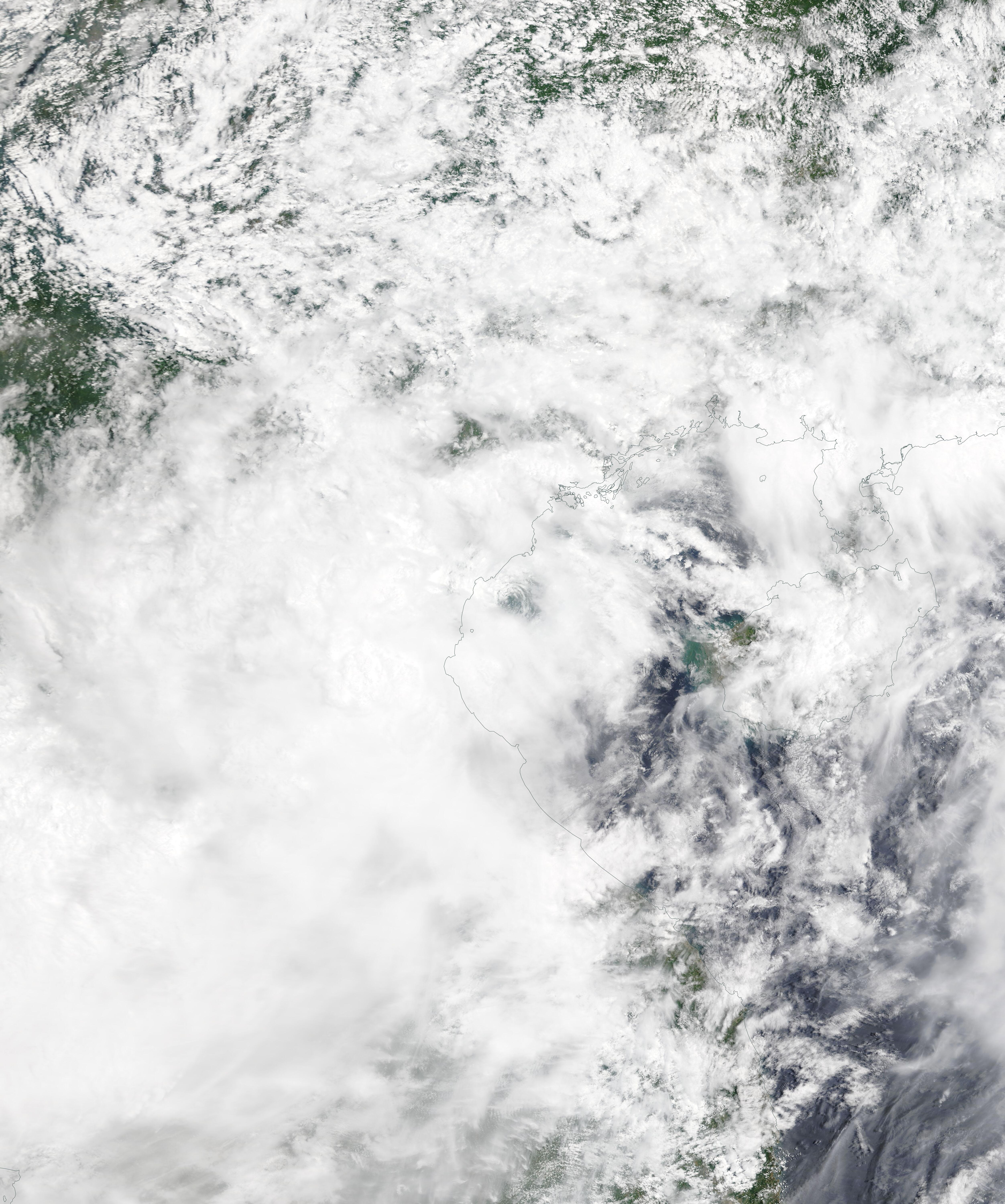
- Tropical Storm Sinlaku at peak intensity, approaching Vietnam on August 2

Meteorological history
- Formed: July 31, 2020
- Dissipated: August 3, 2020

Tropical storm
- 10-minute sustained (JMA)
- Highest winds: 75 km/h (45 mph)
- Lowest pressure: 985 hPa (mbar); 29.09 inHg

Tropical storm
- 1-minute sustained (SSHWS/JTWC)
- Highest winds: 85 km/h (50 mph)
- Lowest pressure: 989 hPa (mbar); 29.21 inHg

Overall effects
- Fatalities: 4 total
- Damage: $12.9 million (2020 USD)
- Areas affected: Philippines, Vietnam, Thailand, Laos
- IBTrACS
- Part of the 2020 Pacific typhoon season

Tropical Storm Sinlaku (Note: The name Sinlaku (Kosraean: Sinlackuh, [sinlɛkʌ]) was contributed by the Federated States of Micronesia and refers to the goddess of nature and breadfruit of Kosrae.) was a weak tropical cyclone that impacted Vietnam, Thailand and Laos in early August 2020. Beginning as a tropical depression on July 31 in the South China Sea, Sinlaku was the fifth storm of the 2020 Pacific typhoon season. It gradually organized as it took a slow west-northwest course, strengthening into a tropical storm the following day despite its monsoonal structure. The storm subsequently made landfall in Vietnam as a broad but weak tropical storm. Persistent land interaction weakened Sinlaku, leading to its dissipation on August 3.

Sinlaku brought heavy monsoonal rains to much of Southeast Asia, especially to Vietnam, Laos, and Thailand. Two people were killed in Vietnam, and two people were killed in Thailand.

== Meteorological history ==
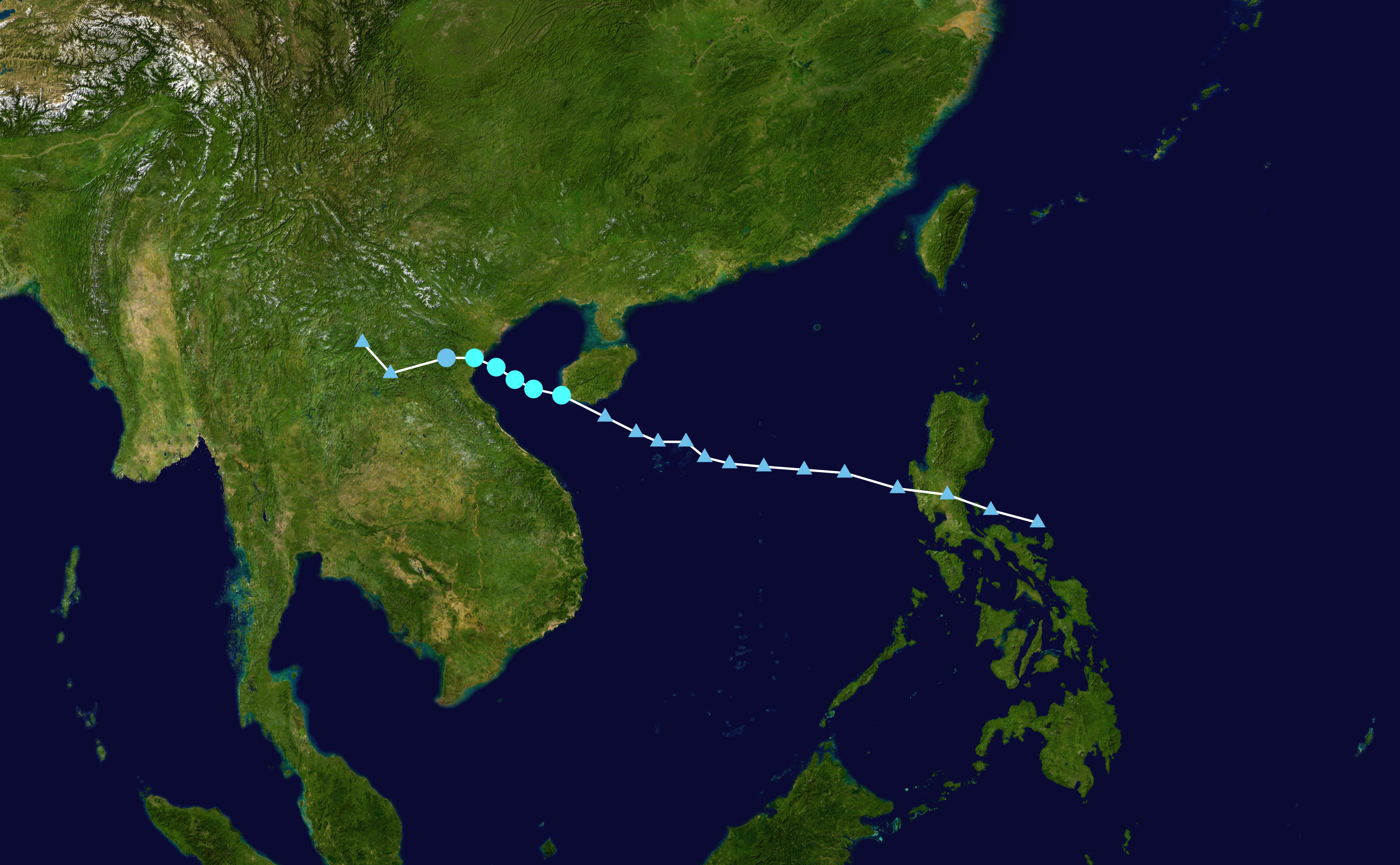
Map plotting the storm's track and intensity, according to the Saffir–Simpson scale Map key Saffir–Simpson scale Tropical depression (≤38 mph, ≤62 km/h) Tropical storm (39–73 mph, 63–118 km/h) Category 1 (74–95 mph, 119–153 km/h) Category 2 (96–110 mph, 154–177 km/h) Category 3 (111–129 mph, 178–208 km/h) Category 4 (130–156 mph, 209–251 km/h) Category 5 (≥157 mph, ≥252 km/h) Unknown Storm type Tropical cyclone Subtropical cyclone Extratropical cyclone, remnant low, tropical disturbance, or monsoon depression

In late July 2020, an area of atmospheric convection began to persist approximately 410 km (255 mi) east of Virac, Catanduanes. Afterwards, the Joint Typhoon Warning Center (JTWC) designated the system a low-chance of developing into a tropical cyclone. Although situated within an environment generally conducive for the formation of a tropical cyclone, the low-pressure area moved towards Luzon, emerging in the South China Sea with little to no organization. The low-pressure system then later left the Philippine Area of Responsibility and moved towards the South China Sea. By the following hours, the JTWC upgraded the disturbance's chance to develop at medium, assessing that the disturbance is a monsoon depression.

On the following day, July 31, the Japan Meteorological Agency (JMA) designated the invest as a tropical depression. In a favorable environment of low vertical shear, excellent equatorial outflow and 31 °C sea surface temperatures, the depression continued to organize, and by the next day, the JMA upgraded depression to a tropical storm, naming it Sinlaku. The JTWC would later follow suit, upgrading the monsoon depression to tropical storm status. Sinlaku would later not intensify further, although the JMA said the storm's pressure lowered to 992 hPa (29.29 inHg). The storm would later make landfall on northern Vietnam, and both agencies issued final advisories on Sinlaku.

== Preparations and impact ==
=== Philippines ===
As a low-pressure area, Sinlaku dumped heavy rain associated with the southwest monsoon over regions of Luzon and Visayas. After crossing Luzon, the storm exited the Philippine Area of Responsibility but it intensified the monsoon.

=== Vietnam ===
In preparation for the storm, Nghệ An Province authorities recalled over 3,000 vessels carrying over 15,000 sailors to shore. Vietnam prime minister Nguyễn Xuân Phúc urged relevant ministries and agencies "to remain updated on the developments of the storm, and map out scenarios for the possible risks of flashfloods, landsides, and severe flooding."

Nearing the northern coast, Sinlaku caused heavy rains across the area, damaging more than 4,000 hectares of crops and over 9,000 hectares of rice crops. The storm damaged over 1,400 houses, with 32 houses being flooded with 30-40 centimeters. Two people were dead, 1 in both Hoa Binh and Quang Ninh provinces, and two were injured in the province of Lam Dong. A thunderstorm from the storm broke 29 trees in districts of Hanoi. The Copernicus emergency satellite mapping service was activated on 3 August to support the damage assessment across northern Vietnam. Total damages were about 300 billion đồng (US$12.94 million).

=== Thailand ===
Moving towards Thailand, Sinlaku's heavy rains caused flash flooding which two people were killed. In Loei Province, the storm brought heavy rains and flash flooding, submerging around 550 households and damaging farmland in the province. In total, 1,399 households were affected by the flash floods.

=== Laos ===
In Xayaboury Province, more than 1,000 people were affected and over 200 houses were damaged.

== See also ==
- Tropical cyclones in 2020
- Weather of 2020
- Tropical Storm Dianmu (2016)
- Tropical Storm Koguma
- Tropical Storm Talim (2023)
- Tropical Storm Prapiroon (2024)
