= Typhoon Choi-wan (2009) =

Pacific typhoon in 2009

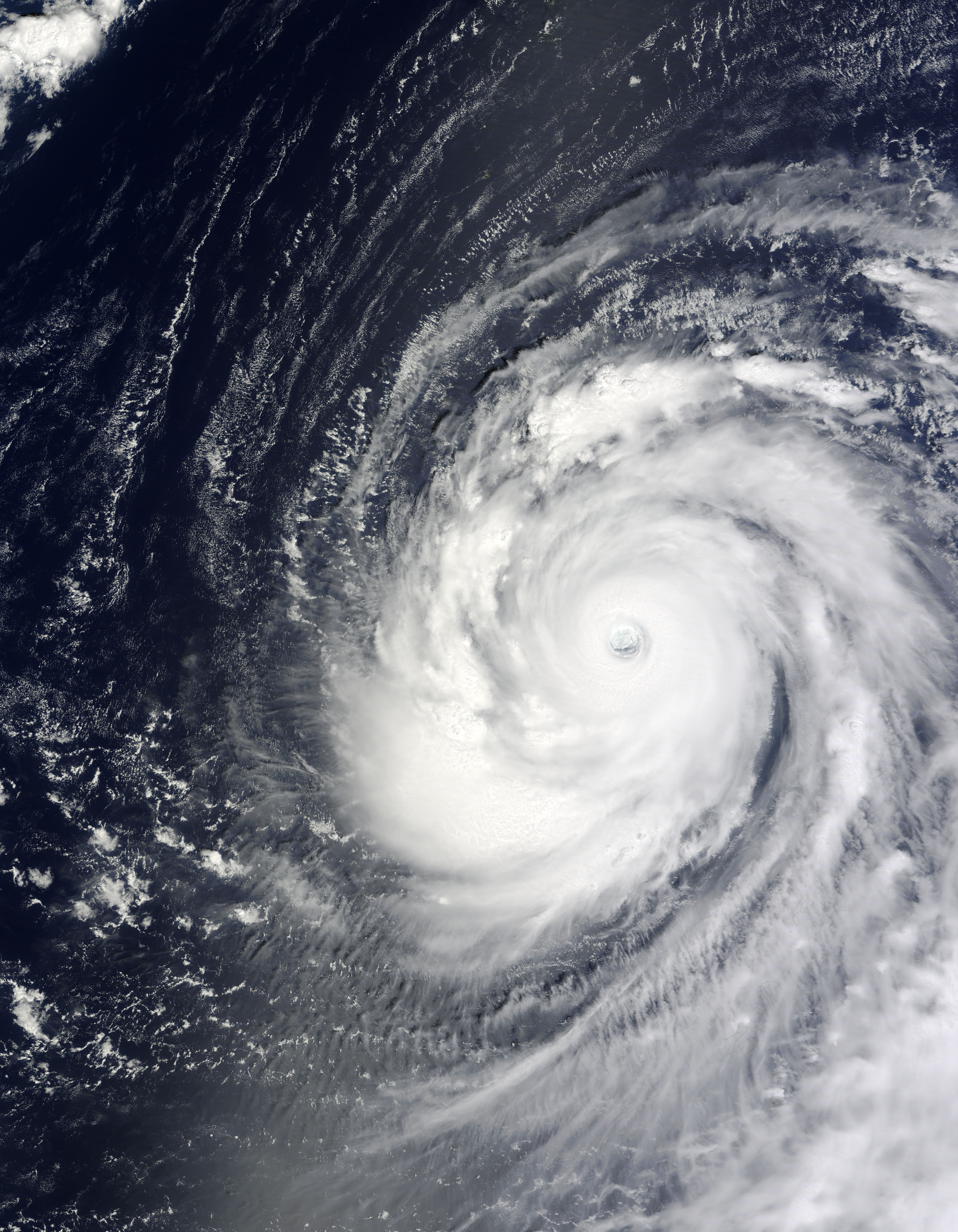
- Typhoon Choi-wan at peak intensity on September 16

Meteorological history
- Formed: September 11, 2009
- Extratropical: September 20, 2009
- Dissipated: September 21, 2009

Violent typhoon
- 10-minute sustained (JMA)
- Highest winds: 195 km/h (120 mph)
- Lowest pressure: 915 hPa (mbar); 27.02 inHg

Category 5-equivalent super typhoon
- 1-minute sustained (SSHWS/JTWC)
- Highest winds: 260 km/h (160 mph)
- Lowest pressure: 918 hPa (mbar); 27.11 inHg

Overall effects
- Fatalities: None
- Damage: Minimal
- Areas affected: Northern Mariana Islands
- IBTrACS
- Part of the 2009 Pacific typhoon season

Typhoon Choi-wan was a powerful typhoon that became the first Category 5-equivalent super typhoon to form during the 2009 Pacific typhoon season. Forming on September 11, 2009, about 1,100 km (700 mi) to the east of Guam, the initial disturbance rapidly organized into a tropical depression. By September 12, the depression intensified into a tropical storm, at which time it was given the name Choi-wan. The following day, rapid intensification took place through September 14. Choi-wan attained its peak intensity on September 15, as it moved through the Northern Mariana Islands with the Japan Meteorological Agency reporting peak 10-minute sustained winds of 195 km/h (121 mph). Additionally, the Joint Typhoon Warning Center reported the storm to have attained 1-minute sustained winds of 260 km/h (160 mph). The typhoon remained very powerful until September 17 when the storm's outflow weakened. The typhoon underwent an eyewall replacement cycle, leading to intensity fluctuations. By September 19, Choi-wan rapidly weakened as strong wind shear caused convection to diminish. The following day, the system transitioned into an extratropical cyclone and dissipated several hours later over open waters.

Despite the intensity of Choi-wan when it passed through the Northern Mariana Islands, no casualties were reported. However, following the storm, the United States Navy deemed that the island of Alamagan was uninhabitable, with all but one of the structures completely destroyed and most of the islands' trees downed. In response to this, all residents on the island were evacuated to nearby Saipan.

== Meteorological history ==
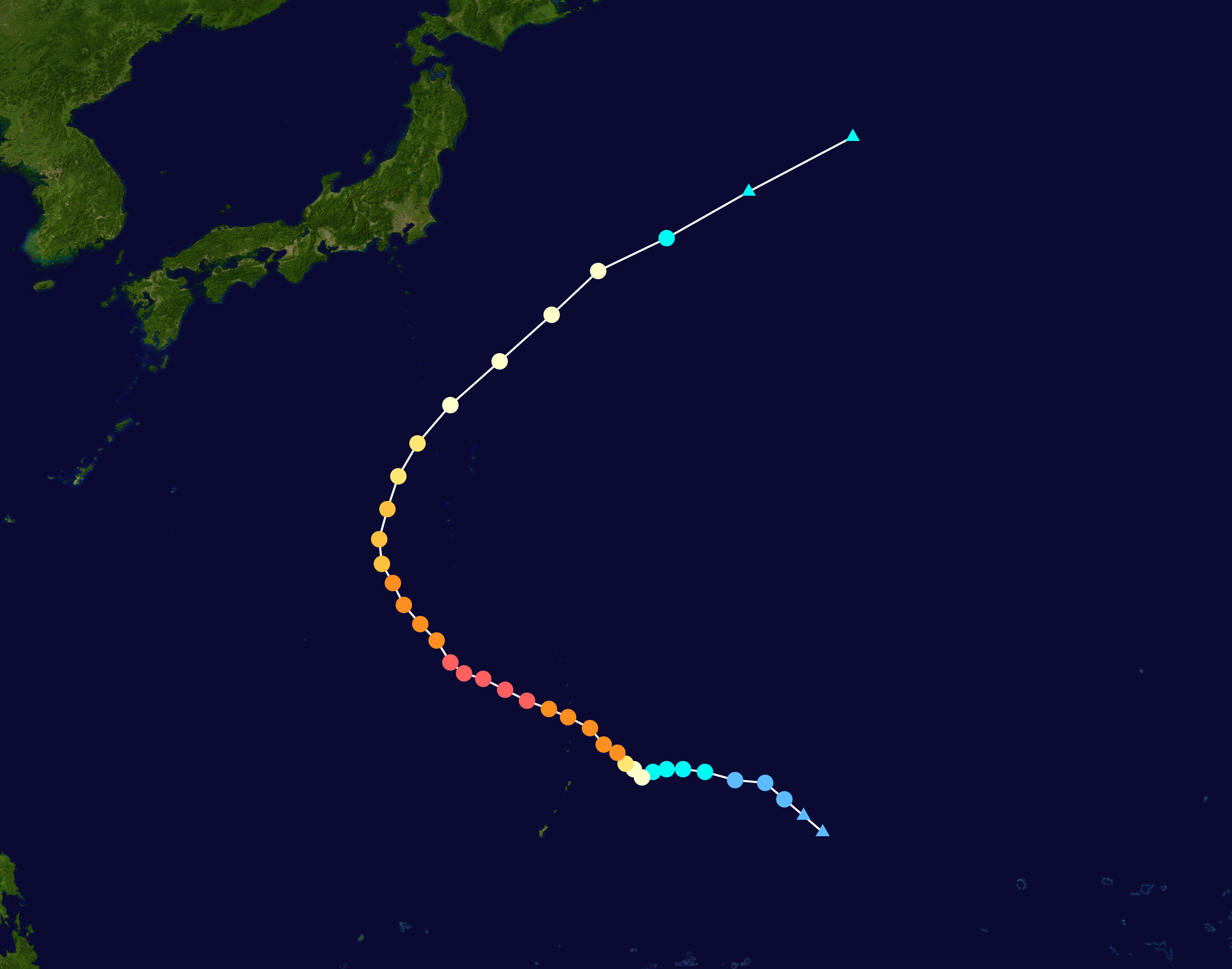
Map plotting the storm's track and intensity, according to the Saffir–Simpson scale Map key Saffir–Simpson scale Tropical depression (≤38 mph, ≤62 km/h) Tropical storm (39–73 mph, 63–118 km/h) Category 1 (74–95 mph, 119–153 km/h) Category 2 (96–110 mph, 154–177 km/h) Category 3 (111–129 mph, 178–208 km/h) Category 4 (130–156 mph, 209–251 km/h) Category 5 (≥157 mph, ≥252 km/h) Unknown Storm type Tropical cyclone Subtropical cyclone Extratropical cyclone, remnant low, tropical disturbance, or monsoon depression

Early on September 11, the Joint Typhoon Warning Center (JTWC) began monitoring an area of convection roughly 1,100 km (680 mi) east of Guam. A broad, low-level circulation center had formed within the system and became increasingly organized, showing signs of developing convective banding. A Tropical Cyclone Formation Alert was released later that day as convection was rapidly consolidating around the low, which was embedded within the eastern end of the monsoonal trough. It was then declared as a tropical depression by the Japan Meteorological Agency (JMA) and the JTWC with the latter designating it as Tropical Depression 15W The tropical depression was tracking westward along the southern edge of the subtropical ridge situated east of the International Date Line.

During September 12, the depression continued to develop quickly with both the JMA and the JTWC reporting that the depression had intensified into a Tropical Storm later that day, with the JMA assigning the international name of Choi-wan and the international designation of 0915. (Note: The name Choi-wan (Cantonese: 彩雲, [t͡sʰɔːi˨˥ wɐn˨˩]) was contributed by Hong Kong and literally means "colorful cloud" in Cantonese.) During September 13, Choi-wan gradually developed whilst moving west with the JMA reporting that Choi-wan had become a severe tropical storm late that day, before reporting along with the JTWC early the next day that Choi-wan had intensified further and had become a weak Typhoon with multiple spiral bands that had wrapped into the fully consolidated center to form a banding eye. During September 14, Choi-wan intensified further whilst moving along the southwestern edge of a deep level subtropical ridge of the northeast, intensifying into a Category 4-equivalent typhoon on the Saffir–Simpson hurricane scale with 1-minute winds of 220 km/h (140 mph).

Early on September 15, the JTWC reported that Typhoon Choi-wan had intensified further and had become a Category 4-equivalent Super Typhoon whilst passing over the island of Alamagan. Later that day the JMA reported that Typhoon Choi-wan had reached its 10-minute peak wind speeds of 195 km/h (121 mph) and a pressure of 915 hPa (mbar). Typhoon Choi-wan then intensified further and reached its peak 1-minute wind speeds of 260 km/h (160 mph) which made it the first Category 5-equivalent tropical cyclone on the Saffir–Simpson hurricane scale anywhere in the world in 2009.

With the help of excellent poleward outflow and high ocean heat content, Typhoon Choi-wan remained at its peak intensity until early on September 17 when deep convection started to erode in the northwestern quadrant as the tropical upper tropospheric trough (TUTT) cell to the northwest was no longer providing good outflow. Choi-wan was then downgraded to a typhoon by the JTWC as it started to undergo an eyewall replacement cycle, with the JTWC reporting a secondary peak intensity of 150 km/h (93 mph), during the next day. During September 19, Choi-wan rapidly weakened, as it moved into an unfavorable environment with higher amounts of vertical wind shear, causing the storm's deep convection to erode. As a result of this and dry latitude air wrapping into the low level circulation center, the JTWC decided to downgrade Choi-wan to an extratropical system and released their final advisory, early the next day before the JMA followed suit later that day. The JMA then reported that the extratropical low had dissipated completely, early on September 21.

== Preparations ==
=== Mariana Islands ===
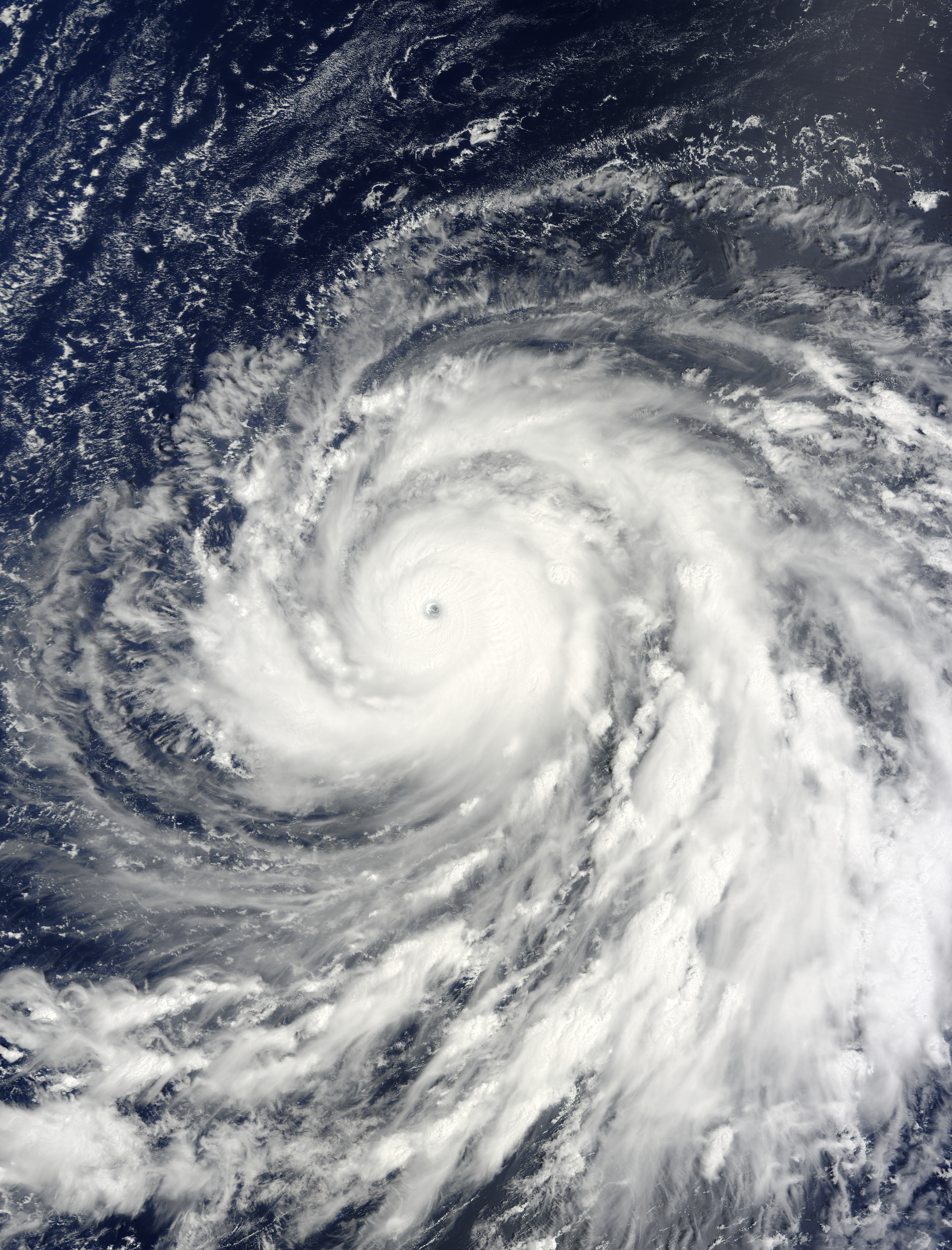
Typhoon Choi-wan near the Mariana Islands

Early on September 12, the National Weather Service Weather Forecast Office in Guam, using data from the JTWC, placed Tinian and Saipan under a Typhoon Watch whilst declaring a Tropical Storm Watch also declared for Guam and Rota. By September 15, the islands of Agrihan, Tinian and Saipan before being upgraded to tropical storm warnings and a typhoon watch. Additionally, the watches in place for Guam and Rota were discontinued. These warnings were kept in force until late on September 14, when the warnings for Tinian were canceled and the typhoon watch for Saipan was canceled, while the typhoon watch was upgraded to a Typhoon Warning as Choi-wan rapidly intensified. The Tropical Storm Warning in place for Saipan was canceled during September 15 as Choi-wan intensified into a high-end Category 4 equivalent super typhoon. All watches and warnings were discontinued during the afternoon of September 16 once Choi-wan was no longer a threat to the Mariana Islands.

By September 15, shelters were opened throughout Tinian and Saipan at local schools, most schools and all governmental buildings were closed and residents rushed to board up their homes. The American Red Cross had also mobilized on the islands by this time. Some private schools were open during the morning but let out early to allow students to return to their families before the typhoon's arrival. On Saipan, 179 residents sought refuge in shelters by the afternoon of September 15, by which time heavy rain had begun falling. Only one flight was delayed by the typhoon across all the islands. The youth basketball league in the Northern Mariana Islands canceled their games for the time Choi-wan passed through the islands. At the height of the storm, a total of 270 residents sought refuge in shelters on Saipan.

=== Japan ===
Early on September 16 the JMA started to issue Typhoon force wind warnings, for the Naha, Okinawa; however these were discontinued later that day. The JMA then placed the Yokohama, Moji and Naha under a Typhoon Warning early the next day. These warnings were kept in place until early on September 19, when the JMA added the Kushiro and Otaru to the warnings. However, the warnings were dropped for all areas except Yokohama and Kushiro as the typhoon turned away from Japan. These warnings stayed in effect until late the next day when they were cancelled as Choi-wan began to dissipate.

== Impact and aftermath ==
On September 15, the eye of Choi-wan passed within 10 km (6.2 mi) of Alamagan and brought winds of up to 230 km/h (140 mph) to the island. The most recent storm of Choi-wan's intensity to strike the islands was Chaba in 2004. That storm caused severe damage and widespread flooding. Unlike Chaba, relatively little rainfall fell due to Choi-wan, and no flooding was reported. The main effects from the typhoon in Saipan were downed trees which littered streets across the islands. Power lines were downed and sewer pipes were broken; however, crews began repairing damage once Choi-wan passed. In Garapan, the major shelter on the island sustained minor damage and repair work on it would take roughly a week.

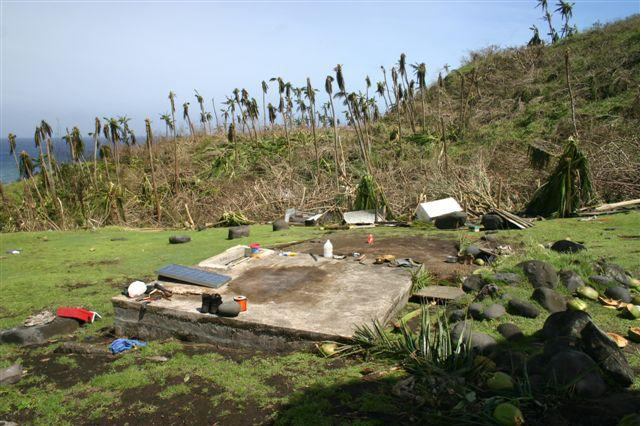
Damage on Alamagan after Typhoon Choi-wan

On Alamagan, residents attempted to contact officials on other islands on September 17. Despite the extreme intensity of the storm, all sixteen residents on the island, including the 4-day old infant were safe. During their attempted contact, the connection was poor and hard to understand. The following day, the United States Navy sent a ship and helicopter to the island to assess the situation. The Navy stated that the entire island of Alamagan was a total loss, with all but one of the structures, a facility for laboratory and research, completely destroyed and most of the islands' trees downed.

Once on the island, they determined that all residents needed to be evacuated "...whether they like or not". The first to be evacuated from the island were the infant and six people in the family; the infant was taken to a hospital on Saipan as a precaution. On nearby Agrihan, it was determined that the residents on the island also needed to be evacuated. Prior to their evacuations, they were given relief supplies, mainly food and water, to survive for five days. Roughly 260 gallons of fresh water, 50 lbs of rice and other health or comfort supplies were delivered by Helicopter Sea Combat Squadron 25 to both islands. On September 21, the Salvation Army announced that residents displaced by the storm would be received donated items, such as clothing, toys, pillows and baby formula.

== See also ==
- Other tropical cyclones named Choi-wan
- Typhoon Dolphin (2015)
- Typhoon Lekima (2013)
- Typhoon Isa
- Typhoon Melor (2009)
