= List of storms named Koppu =

The name Koppu (Japanese: コップ, [ko̞p̚pɯ̟]) has been used for three tropical cyclones in the western North Pacific Ocean. The name was contributed by Japan and refers to the constellation Crater, the cup, in Japanese.

- Typhoon Koppu (2003) (T0316, 17W, Sikat) – remained over the open ocean
- Typhoon Koppu (2009) (T0915, 16W, Nando) – struck China
- Typhoon Koppu (2015) (T1524, 24W, Lando) – a powerful Category 4 Super Typhoon that struck the Philippines

The name Koppu was retired following the 2015 Pacific typhoon season and was replaced with Koguma (Japanese: コグマ, [ko̞ɡɯ̟ma̠]), which refers to the constellation Ursa Minor, the bear cub, in Japanese.
