= Tropical Storm Talim (2023) =

Pacific tropical storm in 2023

Severe Tropical Storm Talim (Dodong)
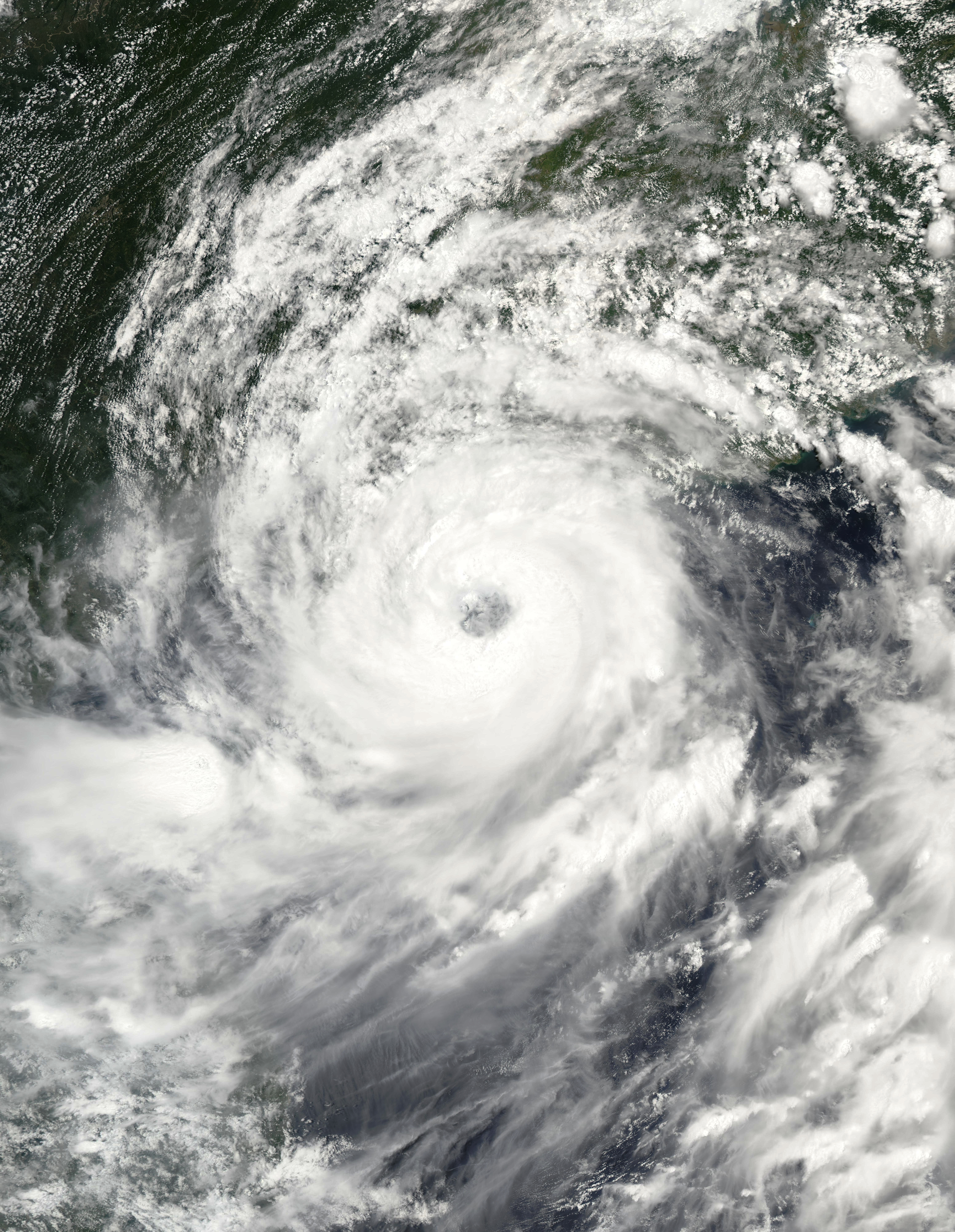
- Severe Tropical Storm Talim at peak intensity on July 17

Meteorological history
- Formed: July 13, 2023
- Dissipated: July 18, 2023

Severe tropical storm
- 10-minute sustained (JMA)
- Highest winds: 110 km/h (70 mph)
- Lowest pressure: 970 hPa (mbar); 28.64 inHg

Category 1-equivalent typhoon
- 1-minute sustained (SSHWS/JTWC)
- Highest winds: 150 km/h (90 mph)
- Lowest pressure: 974 hPa (mbar); 28.76 inHg

Overall effects
- Fatalities: 3
- Injuries: 9
- Damage: $364 million (2023 USD)
- Areas affected: Philippines, China, Vietnam
- IBTrACS
- Part of the 2023 Pacific typhoon season

Severe Tropical Storm Talim, (Note: The name Talim (Tagalog: talim, [tɐˈlɪm]) was contributed by the Philippines and means "sharp and piercing edge of a blade, cutting point" in Tagalog.) known in the Philippines as Tropical Storm Dodong, was a compact tropical cyclone that affected the Philippines, China, and Vietnam in mid-July 2023. The fourth named storm of the 2023 Pacific typhoon season, Talim originated from a weak monsoon depression east of Manila while moving towards Luzon. The system continued to track westward close to the northern edge of mainland Luzon before emerging off the coast of Ilocos Norte. A favorable environment allowed the fledgling tropical storm to rapidly intensify to a high-end Category 1-equivalent typhoon on the Saffir–Simpson scale. The storm maintained this intensity until shortly before landfall near Zhanjiang, Guangdong on July 17. Talim quickly weakened and dissipated early on July 18.

Talim brought heavy monsoonal rains over the Philippines and brought heavy rainfall and gusty conditions over the country as it neared Luzon. Rainfall from the storm helped raise the water level significantly in Angat Dam, the main water source for areas in Metro Manila but only slightly in more northern Magat Dam in Isabela. In China, authorities in Guangdong Province ordered the evacuation of at least 1,000 residents in Yunfu. In Vietnam, authorities announced on July 17, that the countries were preparing to evacuate approximately 30,000 individuals from high-risk locations in Quang Ninh, Thái Bình, and Haiphong. Overall, the storm was responsible for three deaths, nine injuries and US$364 million in damage across several countries.

== Meteorological history ==
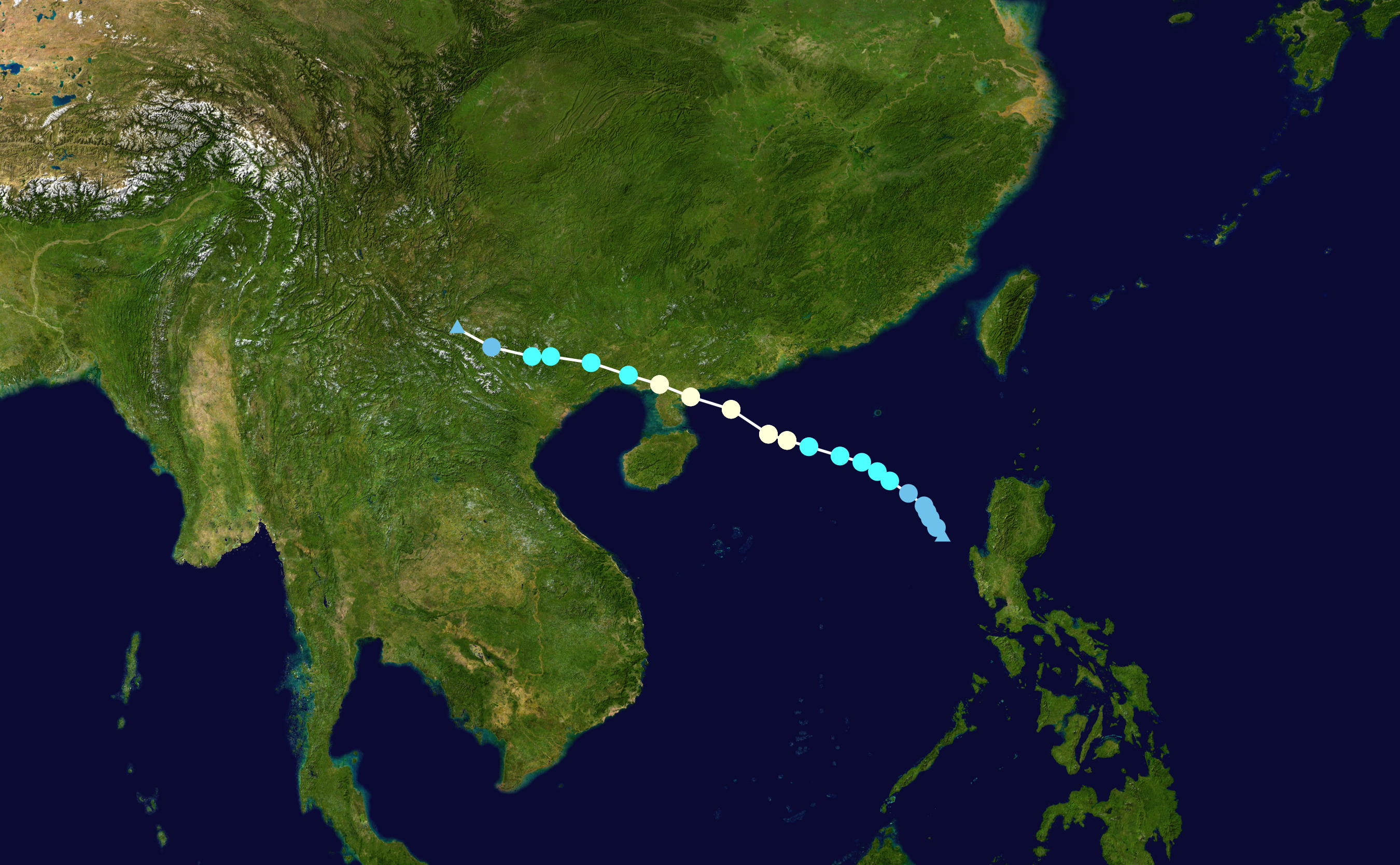
Map plotting the storm's track and intensity, according to the Saffir–Simpson scale Map key Saffir–Simpson scale Tropical depression (≤38 mph, ≤62 km/h) Tropical storm (39–73 mph, 63–118 km/h) Category 1 (74–95 mph, 119–153 km/h) Category 2 (96–110 mph, 154–177 km/h) Category 3 (111–129 mph, 178–208 km/h) Category 4 (130–156 mph, 209–251 km/h) Category 5 (≥157 mph, ≥252 km/h) Unknown Storm type Tropical cyclone Subtropical cyclone Extratropical cyclone, remnant low, tropical disturbance, or monsoon depression

On July 12, the Joint Typhoon Warning Center (JTWC) began tracking a weak monsoon depression 298 nautical miles (552 km; 343 mi) east of Manila, slowly moving towards northern Luzon. By the next day, the Japan Meteorological Agency (JMA) took note of same system, which was just off the coast of Aurora, Philippines. A few hours later at 12:00 UTC, the JMA recognized the formation of a tropical depression. Shortly after, the Philippine Atmospheric, Geophysical, and Astronomical Services Administration (PAGASA) issued a similar announcement, and subsequently named the system Dodong. The system made landfall in Dinapigue, Isabela a few hours later. The system continued to track westward close to the northern edge of mainland Luzon, crossing through Cagayan and Ilocos Norte. It emerged off the coast of Ilocos Norte on July 14 at 09:00 UTC (17:00 PHT).

Around 15:00 UTC, the JTWC began issuing advisories for the tropical depression and designated the system as 04W. Now back in warm seas and moving further westward away from land, the system found itself in a favorable environment and began consolidating further. The system intensified into a tropical storm just prior to exiting the PAR and was subsequently named Talim by the JMA. Talim left the Philippine Area of Responsibility while it maintained its strength which was announced by the PAGASA in its final bulletin on July 15. The storm had a broad LLCC with deep convection persisting along the western and southern periphery.

Talim continued to intensify in the South China Sea, later being upgraded into a severe tropical storm. Talim moved west-northwestward within a favorable environment was being offset by equatorward outflow. Talim continued to improved its convective banding with satellite imagery revealed a 30 nautical miles (56 km; 35 mi) ragged eye. The JTWC's assessed the storm to have strengthened into 155 km/h (100 mph), equivalent to Category 2-equivalent typhoon status Talim's started to rapidly deteriorate as it approached land. Talim made its second landfall in Zhanjiang, Guangdong, with winds of 136 km/h (85 mph) on July 17. As it moved further inland, Talim rapidly weakened. Shortly after the landfall, the JTWC discontinued warnings on the system. The JMA issued its last advisory on Talim and later declared it dissipated early on the next day.

== Preparations and impact ==
Animated satellite loop of Severe Tropical Storm Talim from peak intensity to landfall in Guangdong Province, China, on July 17

=== Philippines ===
Winds from Talim enhanced the East Asian monsoon over the Philippines and brought heavy rainfall and gusty conditions over the country as it neared Luzon. Classes in three cities and in Cagayan were suspended as the storm crossed Luzon. Three domestic flights were canceled. Rainfall from the storm helped raised the water level significantly in Angat Dam, the main water source for areas in Metro Manila, but only slightly in more northern Magat Dam in Isabela. Earlier in the month, both dams neared critical levels as rainfall decreased from the onset of El Niño conditions.

As Talim made landfall in Isabela, the PAGASA raised Tropical Cyclone Wind Signal No. 1 warnings for multiple areas in Luzon. As of the morning of 21 July 2023, the National Disaster Risk Reduction and Management Council (NDRRMC) reports 244,824 people have been affected by the storm. Agricultural damages are estimated by the NDRRMC at ₱199 million, with infrastructural damages estimated at ₱100 million. In addition, 153 houses were damaged (with 45 houses totally destroyed). In total, the NDRRMC estimates at least ₱299 million (US$5.75 million) in damages due to Talim. Overall, the storm was responsible for 2 deaths.

=== China ===
The China Meteorological Administration (CMA) raised an orange typhoon alert because the storm was expected to bring gales and torrential rains to some areas in southern China. On July 17, at 00:40 UTC, the Hong Kong Observatory (HKO) issued Signal No. 8 warnings as Talim approached the city and its winds strengthened further. Zhuhai Jinwan Airport in Guangdong canceled 43 inbound and 36 outbound flights, while Haikou Meilan International Airport and Qionghai Bo'ao Airport canceled all flights. High-speed railway and suburban trains in Hainan were also suspended. Rainfall totals of 25–30 cm (9.8–11.8 in) are possible in parts of Hainan Island, southern Guangdong, and the southeast of Guangxi province. Ahead of the storm's arrival, authorities in Guangdong Province ordered the evacuation of at least 1,000 residents in Yunfu. On Hainan Island, train services have been suspended, and schools, shops, and numerous recreational facilities have been closed as locals are advised to stay at home during the storm's passage. Due to the storm, the Hong Kong Stock Exchange ceased trading on July 17. Ferry services in the Qiongzhou Strait were also suspended on July 16.

According to Hong Kong's Hospital Authority, nine persons suffered injuries. From Guangdong to Hainan Province, the southern coastline was also battered by storm surges and torrential rain. One woman drowned in Jiangsu after riding her electric bike in a flooded tunnel. Container terminals in Guangdong province, Hainan Island, and Hong Kong ceased their operations. Classes, labor, flights, and business activities will be suspended in Haikou, according to the China Central Television (CCTV). Additionally, Guangdong local authorities ordered the evacuation of 8,262 fish farming workers and the closure of 68 popular coastal tourist attractions.

Economic losses from Talim were amounted to ¥2.61 billion (US$358 million)

=== Vietnam ===
An emergency storm warning has been issued for Talim by the National Center for Hydro-Meteorological Forecasting. Rainfall totals of 20–30 cm (7.9–11.8 in) are anticipated, with locally higher totals of up to 40 cm (16 in). Vietnamese authorities announced on July 17 the country's were preparing to evacuate approximately 30,000 individuals from high-risk locations in Quang Ninh, Thái Bình, and Haiphong. In northeastern coastal areas, vessels have been told to return to shore. Talim caused an estimated 20 billion đồng (US$845,200) in damages to 214 riverside locations that were eroded. Talim also caused over 20.7 billion đồng (US$874,782) in damages to properties.

== See also ==
- Tropical cyclones in 2023
- Weather of 2023

Other similar comparisons to Talim:

- Typhoon Nona (1952) – took a comparable trajectory.
- Typhoon Olive (1960) – affected similar areas.
- Typhoons Dinah (Bising) and Ivy (Iliang) (1974) – both took identical tracks.
- Typhoon Prapiroon (Henry; 2006) – also made landfall in Luzon and Guangdong.
- Typhoon Koppu (Nando; 2009) – took a very similar track
- Typhoon Nesat (Pedring; 2011) – a similar system that was deadly and costly.
- Typhoon Kai-tak (Helen; 2012) – took an identical trajectory.
- Typhoon Utor (Labuyo; 2013) – a destructive typhoon that caused widespread damages over Central and Northern Luzon.
- Tropical Storm Sinlaku (2020) – took a similar track.
