= List of storms named Dante =

The name Dante has been used for six tropical cyclones in the Philippines by PAGASA in the Western Pacific Ocean. It replaced the name Darna following the 2001 Pacific typhoon season.

- Typhoon Nesat (2005) (T0504, 04W, Dante) – approached Japan
- Typhoon Kujira (2009) (T0901, 01W, Dante) – triggered severe flooding and mudslides which killed 28 people on Luzon
- Tropical Storm Yagi (2013) (T1303, 03W, Dante) – slightly impacted the Philippines and Japan
- Tropical Storm Muifa (2017) (T1701, 03W, Dante) – never affected land
- Tropical Storm Choi-wan (2021) (T2103, 04W, Dante) – crossed the Philippines and later affected Taiwan
- Tropical Storm Francisco (2025) (T2507, 10W, Dante) – minimal tropical storm that passed through the Ryukyu Islands before making landfall in China

Preceded by Chico	Pacific typhoon season names Dante	Succeeded by Elias
