= Typhoon Koppu =

Pacific typhoon in 2015

Typhoon Koppu (Lando)
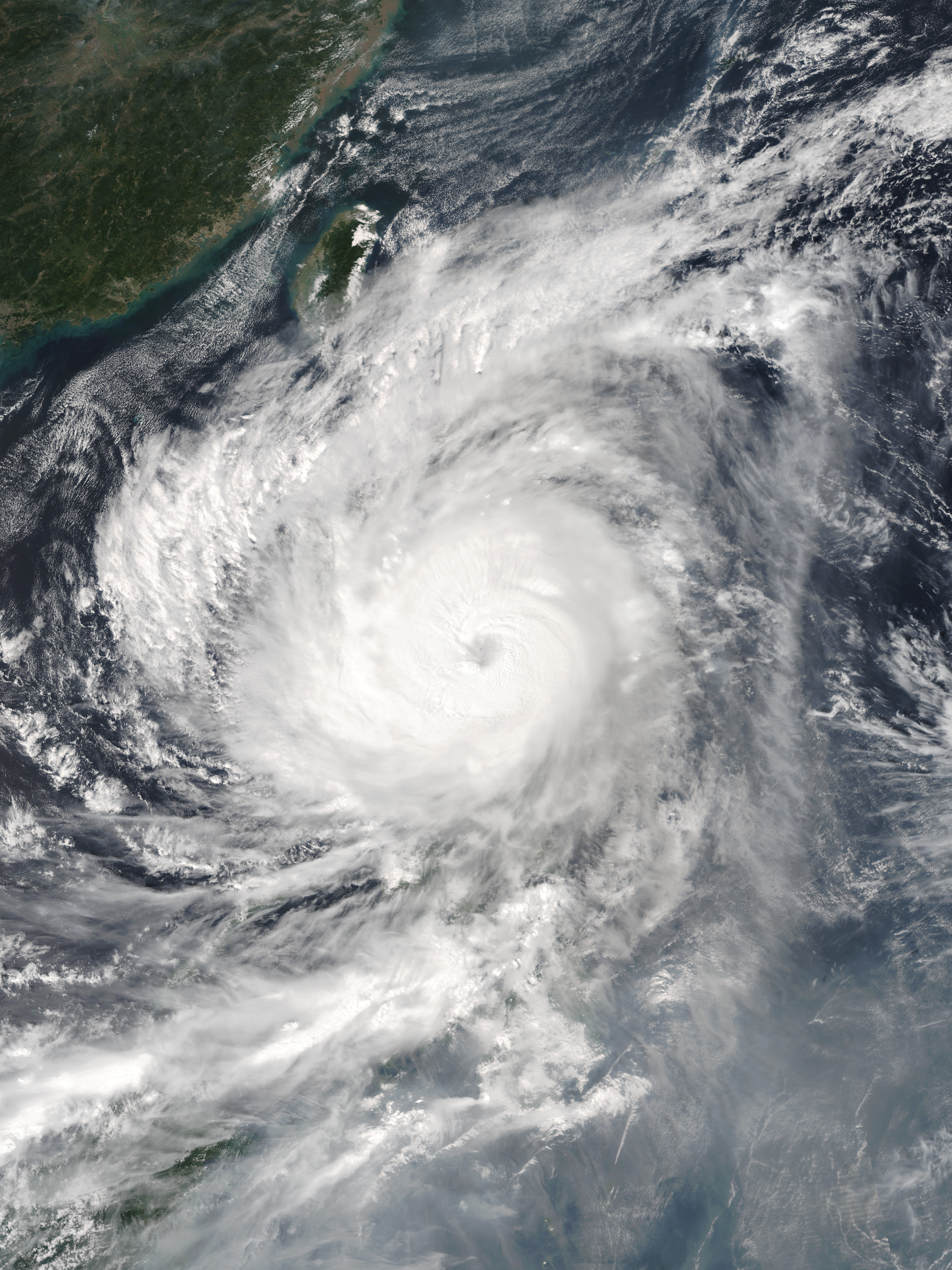
- Koppu approaching the Philippines prior to its peak intensity on October 17

Meteorological history
- Formed: October 12, 2015
- Dissipated: October 21, 2015

Very strong typhoon
- 10-minute sustained (JMA)
- Highest winds: 185 km/h (115 mph)
- Lowest pressure: 925 hPa (mbar); 27.32 inHg

Category 4-equivalent super typhoon
- 1-minute sustained (SSHWS/JTWC)
- Highest winds: 240 km/h (150 mph)
- Lowest pressure: 926 hPa (mbar); 27.34 inHg

Overall effects
- Fatalities: 62 total
- Damage: $948 million (2015 USD)
- Areas affected: Philippines
- IBTrACS
- Part of the 2015 Pacific typhoon season

Typhoon Koppu, (Note: The name Koppu (Japanese: コップ, [ko̞p̚pɯ̟]) was contributed by Japan and refers to the constellation Crater, the cup, in Japanese.) also locally known in the Philippines as Typhoon Lando, was a powerful and devastating tropical cyclone that struck the Philippine island of Luzon in mid-October 2015. The twenty-fourth named storm and fifteenth typhoon of the 2015 Pacific typhoon season, Koppu originated from a tropical disturbance east of the Mariana Islands on October 10. Moving briskly westward, the system consolidated into a tropical depression the following day and further into a tropical storm on October 13. Over the warm waters of the Philippine Sea, Koppu quickly deepened. The storm reached its peak intensity on October 17 with ten-minute sustained winds of 185 km/h (115 mph), according to the Japan Meteorological Agency (JMA). The Joint Typhoon Warning Center (JTWC) classified Koppu as a Category 4-equivalent super typhoon with one-minute sustained winds of 240 km/h (150 mph). The storm subsequently made landfall at this strength near Casiguran, Aurora, Philippines. Shortly after, Koppu rapidly weakened due to interaction with the mountainous terrain of Luzon and the disheveled core of Koppu emerged over the South China Sea on October 19. Unfavorable environmental conditions inhibited reorganization and the system diminished to a tropical depression on October 21.

Prior to Koppu's landfall, PAGASA raised Public Storm Warning Signals for numerous provinces; nearly 24,000 people evacuated accordingly. The storm caused tremendous structural damage in coastal provinces, with thousands of structures damaged or destroyed. Prolonged, heavy rains that peaked at 1,077.8 mm (42.43 in) in Baguio exacerbated the storm's effects and resulted in widespread flooding. 62 people were killed across the country and more than 100,000 others were displaced. Preliminary damage totals amount to ₱14.4 billion (US$313 million).

== Meteorological history ==
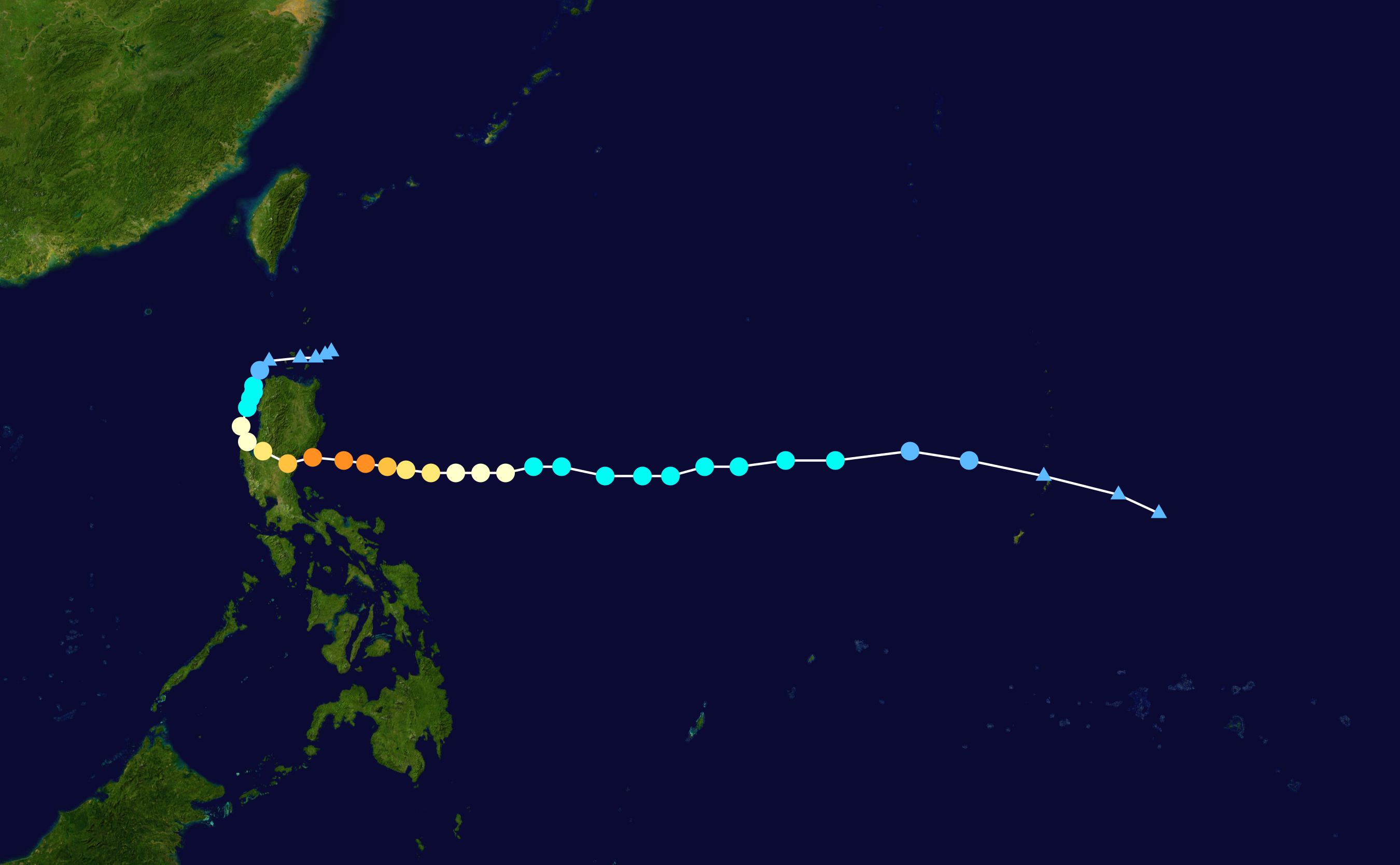
Map plotting the storm's track and intensity, according to the Saffir–Simpson scale Map key Saffir–Simpson scale Tropical depression (≤38 mph, ≤62 km/h) Tropical storm (39–73 mph, 63–118 km/h) Category 1 (74–95 mph, 119–153 km/h) Category 2 (96–110 mph, 154–177 km/h) Category 3 (111–129 mph, 178–208 km/h) Category 4 (130–156 mph, 209–251 km/h) Category 5 (≥157 mph, ≥252 km/h) Unknown Storm type Tropical cyclone Subtropical cyclone Extratropical cyclone, remnant low, tropical disturbance, or monsoon depression

A tropical disturbance formed in a monsoon trough late on October 10, over Enewetak Atoll. One day later, the Japan Meteorological Agency (JMA) upgraded the low-pressure area to a tropical depression, yet the low-level circulation center was exposed owing to strong vertical wind shear. On October 12, as the system kept consolidating with convection sheared to the west, the Joint Typhoon Warning Center (JTWC) issued a Tropical Cyclone Formation Alert; half a day after, the JMA started to issue tropical cyclone warnings about the tropical depression. The JTWC upgraded the system to a tropical depression early on October 13, although fragmented convective bands were wrapping tighter into a broad LLCC which remained exposed. At noon, tracking westward along the southern periphery of the deep-layered subtropical ridge, the system intensified into a tropical storm and was named Koppu by the JMA.

Early on October 14, the storm entered the Philippine Area of Responsibility and received the name Lando from PAGASA, and deepened convection finally obscured the LLCC late on the same day, shortly before being upgraded to a severe tropical storm by the JMA. Under a favorable environment of low vertical wind shear and radial outflow, Koppu deepened rapidly and intensified into a typhoon in the afternoon of October 15, when a tightly curved convective band was wrapping into an eye revealed by a microwave imagery. Intensification slowed down until an apparent but ragged eye formed one day later, as sea surface temperature was over 31 °C (88 °F) in the Philippine Sea. The 35 km (22 mi) eye became sharper on October 17, prompting the JTWC upgrading Koppu to a super typhoon with one-minute maximum sustained winds at 240 km/h (150 mph) in the afternoon, equivalent to Category 4 of the Saffir–Simpson hurricane wind scale. Around 01:00 PHT on October 18 (17:00 UTC on October 17), Koppu made landfall over Casiguran, Aurora in the Philippines; however, the JMA then reported that Koppu reached its peak intensity with ten-minute maximum sustained winds at 185 km/h (115 mph) and the central pressure at 920 hPa (27 inHg).

Frictional effects from land interaction with Luzon started to erode the typhoon rapidly after landfall, despite excellent dual outflow channels. Before noon or in the afternoon on October 18, Koppu emerged into the South China Sea as a disorganized system which had begun to encounter with stronger easterly vertical wind shear. Tracking northward very slowly along the western periphery of an extension of the deep-layered subtropical ridge to the east-northeast, the proximity to Luzon was inhibiting the system from consolidating, leading the JMA to downgrade Koppu to a severe tropical storm when main convection had been sheared to the west early on October 19. Both the JTWC and then the JMA downgraded the highly unorganized system with a ragged LLCC to a tropical storm in the afternoon. Continuing hugging the coast of Luzon on October 20, Koppu drifted northeastward and then east-northeastward due to embedded within a weak complex steering environment with a near-equatorial ridge to the south and an induced ridge between Typhoon Champi and Koppu; convective organization was also hampered by being embedded in a mid-level trough along the western periphery of the subtropical ridge.

== Preparations and impact ==
=== Highest Tropical Cyclone Warning Signal ===
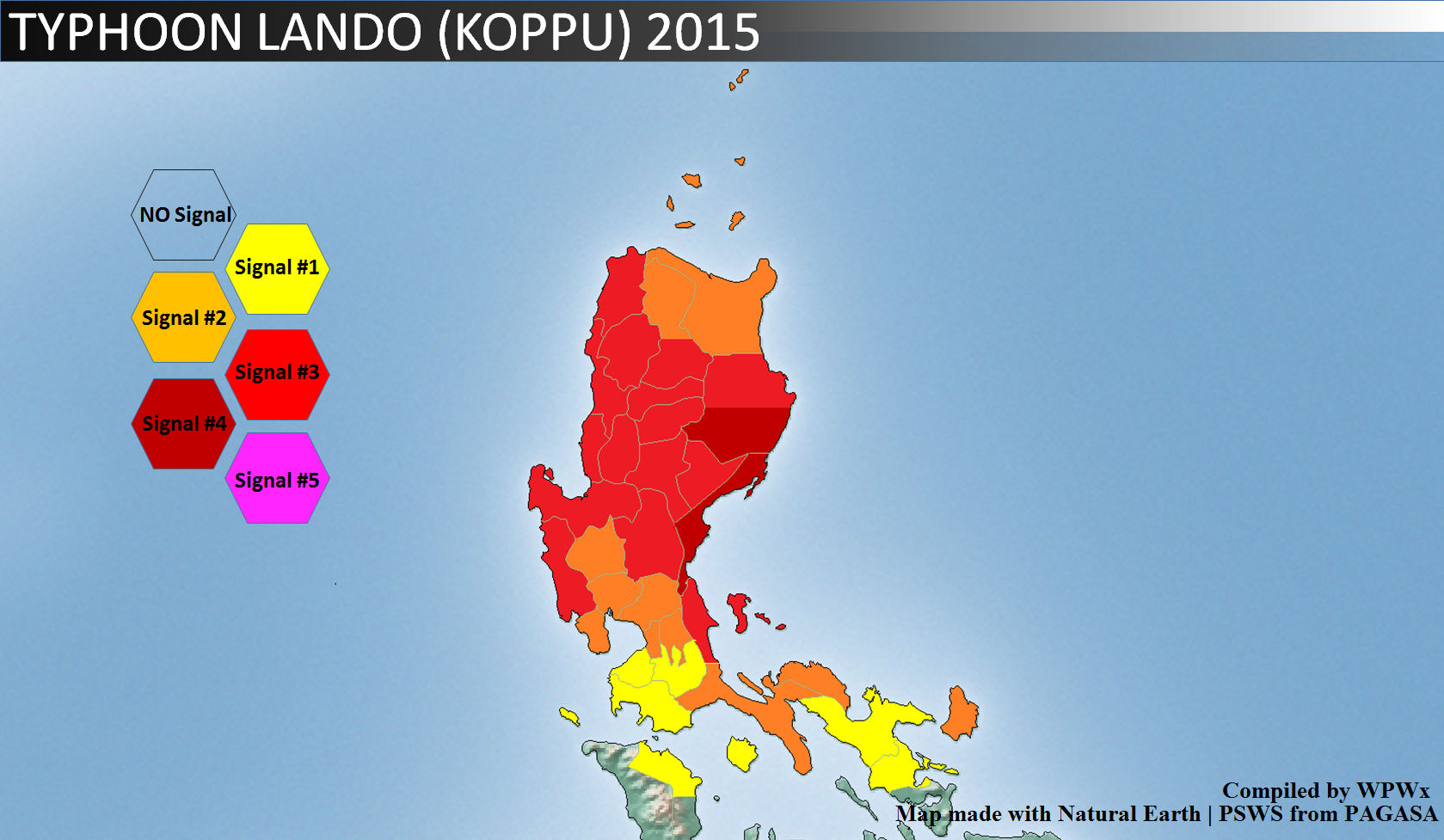
Highest TCWS raised by PAGASA across the Philippines in relation to Typhoon Koppu

| TCWS# | Luzon | Visayas | Mindanao |
|---|---|---|---|
| 4 | Aurora, Southern portion of Isabela | None | None |
| 3 | Ilocos Norte, Ilocos Sur, Abra, Kalinga, Mountain Province, Rest of Isabela, La Union, Ifugao, Benguet, Nueva Vizcaya, Quirino, Pangasinan, Nueva Ecija, Zambales, Northern portion of Quezon including Polillo Islands | None | None |
| 2 | Metro Manila, Batanes, Babuyan Islands, Apayao, Cagayan, Tarlac, Pampanga, Bataan, Bulacan, Rizal, Rest of Quezon, Camarines Norte, Catanduanes | None | None |
| 1 | Cavite, Laguna, Batangas, Lubang Island, Northern portion of Oriental Mindoro, Marinduque, Camarines Sur, Albay | None | None |

PAGASA began issuing Public Storm Warning Signals (PSWS) for the Philippines starting on October 15, at which time Koppu was situated 755 km (469 mi) east of Baler, Aurora. The advised areas were initially concentrated around east-central Luzon. As the typhoon intensified, the PSWS levels were raised and expanded. At 09:00 UTC on October 17, PSWS #4—the second-highest level—was issued for Aurora Province as winds of 171 to 220 km/h (106 to 137 mph) were anticipated in the province within 12 hours; this was expanded to include southern Isabela Province hours later. Following the storm's landfall, PSWS were gradually lowered over the subsequent several days. Nearly 24,000 people evacuated ahead of the typhoon's arrival while numerous schools, businesses, and government offices closed. A total of 88 flights were canceled.

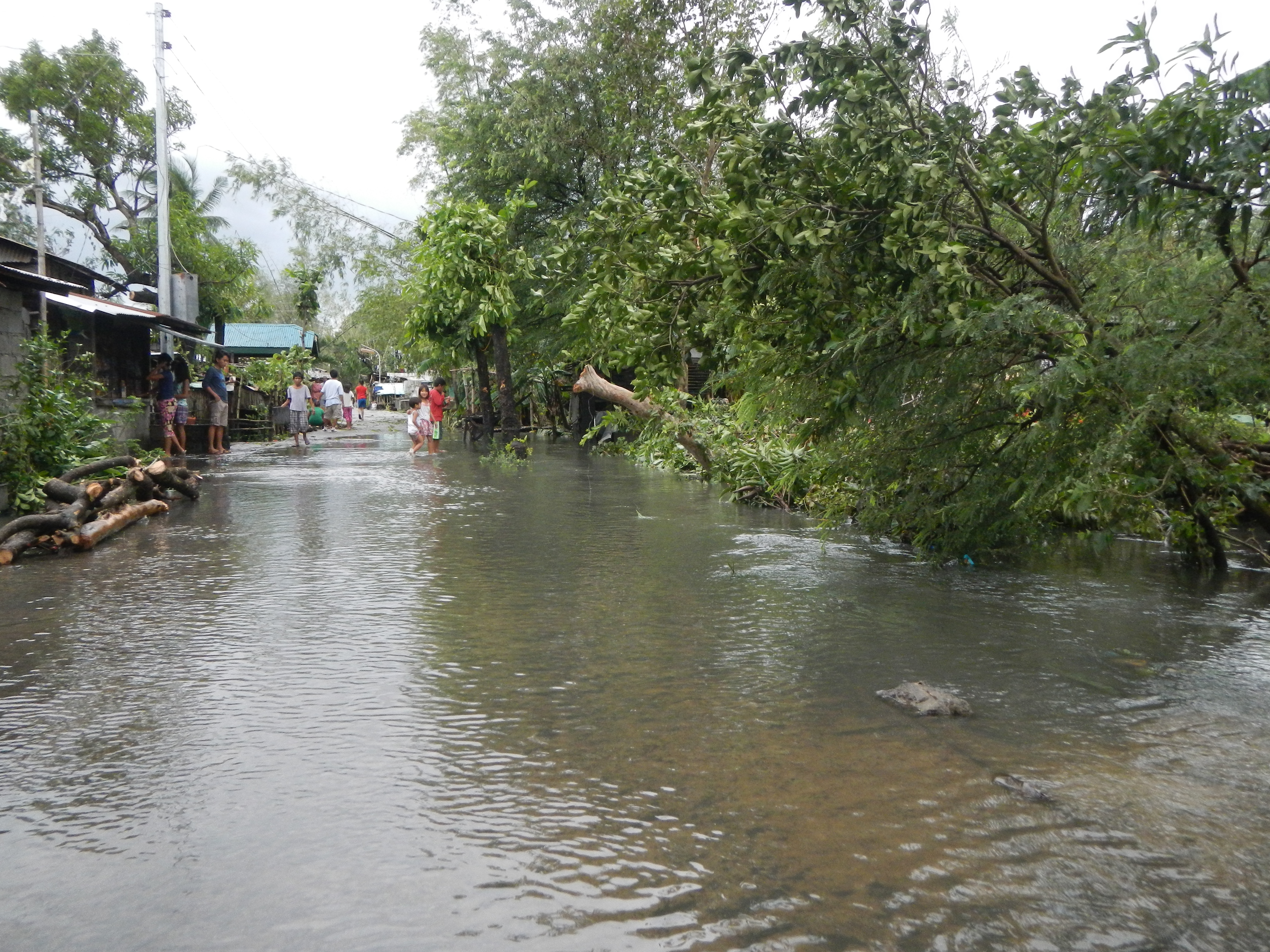
Downed trees and street flooding in Moncada, Tarlac, following Typhoon Koppu

Powerful winds caused widespread damage and disruption across Luzon. Nine provinces suffered total power outages and throughout the affected regions of Luzon, approximately 9 million people—roughly 10 percent of the entire nation—lost electricity. Aurora Province sustained a direct hit from the typhoon. Nearly every structure in Casiguran was damaged or destroyed. The nearby towns of Dinalungan and Dilasag were rendered inaccessible. Torrential rains fell across much of region, with western coastal areas seeing the highest accumulations. A storm total of 1,077.8 mm (42.43 in) was observed in Baguio, with 800 mm (31 in) falling in a 24-hour span. Just south of Baguio at the San Roque Dam, an unconfirmed 24-hour accumulation of 1,317 mm (51.9 in), including 717 mm (28.2 in) in 12 hours, was reported. If verified, these would be the greatest 12- and 24-hour rainfall totals on record in the Philippines. The heaviest rains were fairly concentrated, with Quezon City in Metro Manila to the south recording only 97.8 mm (3.85 in). Along the northwestern coast, Vigan saw 200.2 mm (7.88 in) accumulate.

Approximately 1.24 million people were directly affected by the storm; at one point, 113,584 people moved to evacuation centers. Throughout the affected regions, 17,254 homes were damaged and 1,504 were destroyed. 62 people were killed, and total damage reached ₱14.4 billion (US$313 million).

In the central Philippines, two motorboats capsized in separate incidents resulting in a collective ten fatalities. Virac and Daet saw 179.4 and 152.3 mm (7.06 and 6.00 in) of rain, respectively, as Koppu passed to the north.

== Aftermath ==
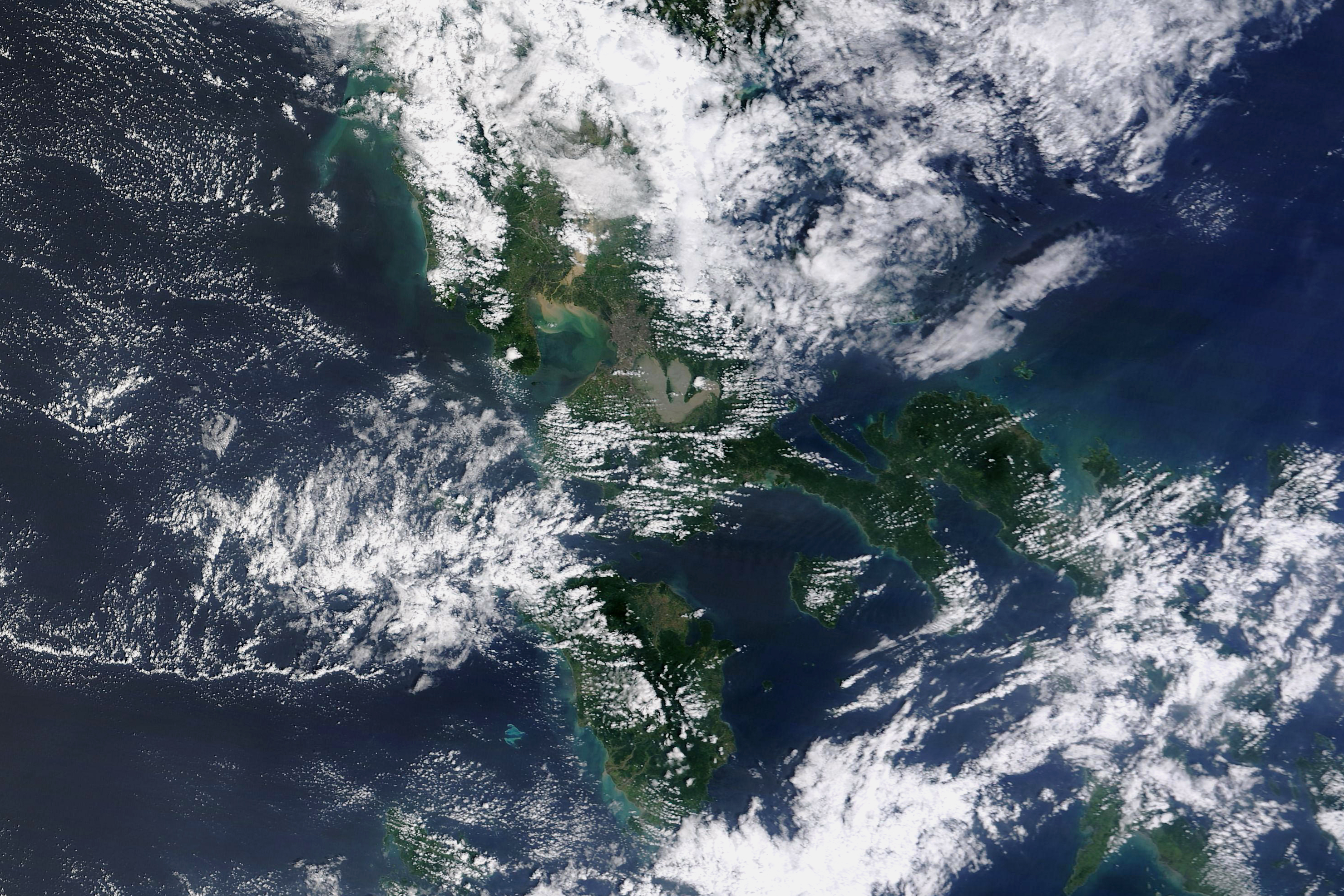
Flooding and sediment caused by Koppu was seen over Pampanga River and Manila Bay on October 21

The Philippines' National Disaster Risk Reduction and Management Council (NDRRMC) has provided ₱122.8 million (US$2.67 million) worth of assistance. On October 18, Australia was the first foreign government to offer support to typhoon relief. On 22 October Australian Foreign Minister Julie Bishop announced A$1 million (US$726,000) in support to families affected by the typhoon.

A state of calamity was declared for the provinces of Aurora, Cagayan, Isabela, Nueva Ecija, Nueva Vizcaya, Tarlac, Pangasinan, Quirino, three cities namely Dagupan, Ilagan and Tuguegarao, and to nine towns specifically Arayat, Baler, Cabatuan, Calumpit, Camiling, General Nakar, Infanta, Ramos and Sugpon owing to widespread flooding.

=== Retirement ===
Due to the typhoon's destructive effects in the Philippines, the name Koppu was retired at the Fourth Joint Session of the ESCAP/WMO Typhoon Committee and WMO/ESCAP Panel on Tropical Cyclones during 2016. In February 2017, they chose the name Koguma to replace Koppu. The name Koguma was first used in the 2021 Pacific typhoon season. PAGASA also announced that Lando will be removed from their naming lists and will never be used again. Its replacement name will be Liwayway to replace Lando which was first used in the 2019 season.

== See also ==
- Weather of 2015
- Tropical cyclones in 2015
- List of Philippine typhoons (2000–present)
