= Typhoon Kujira (2009) =

Pacific typhoon in 2009

Typhoon Kujira (Dante)
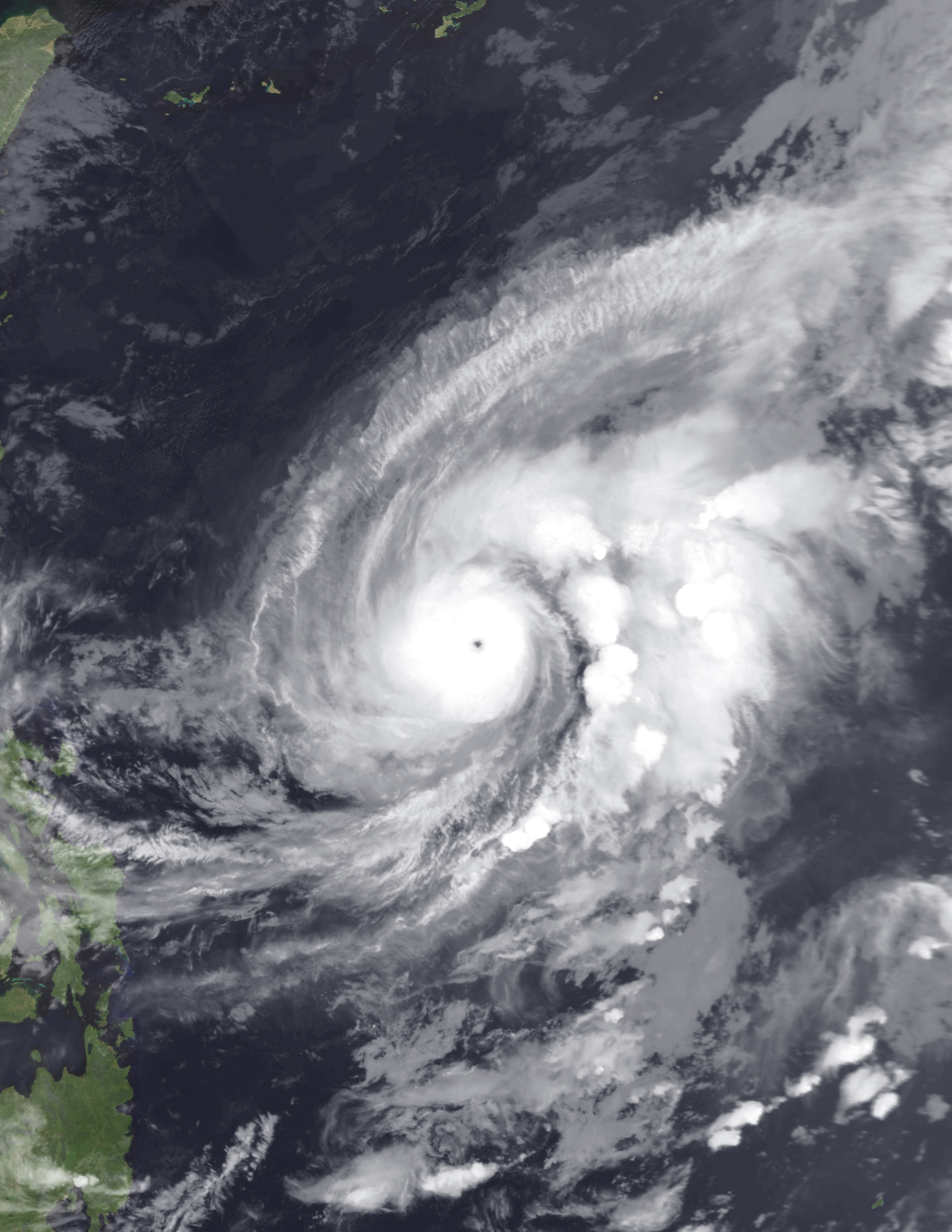
- Typhoon Kujira near peak intensity on May 4

Meteorological history
- Formed: May 1, 2009
- Extratropical: May 7, 2009
- Dissipated: May 13, 2009

Very strong typhoon
- 10-minute sustained (JMA)
- Highest winds: 155 km/h (100 mph)
- Lowest pressure: 940 hPa (mbar); 27.76 inHg

Category 4-equivalent typhoon
- 1-minute sustained (SSHWS/JTWC)
- Highest winds: 215 km/h (130 mph)
- Lowest pressure: 937 hPa (mbar); 27.67 inHg

Overall effects
- Fatalities: 27 direct
- Missing: 1
- Damage: ≥$14.3 million (2009 USD)
- Areas affected: Philippines, Russian Far East
- IBTrACS
- Part of the 2009 Pacific typhoon season

Typhoon Kujira, (Note: The name Kujira (Japanese: クジラ, [kɯ̟ʑiɾa̠]) was contributed by Japan and refers to the constellation Cetus, the whale, in Japanese.) known in the Philippines as Typhoon Dante, was first reported by the Joint Typhoon Warning Center (JTWC) on April 28. It was the fourth depression and the first typhoon of the season. The disturbance dissipated later that day however it regenerated early on April 30 within the southern islands of Luzon. It was then designated as a Tropical Depression during the next morning by the Philippine Atmospheric, Geophysical and Astronomical Services Administration (PAGASA) and the Japan Meteorological Agency (JMA), with PAGASA assigning the name Dante to the depression. However the JTWC did not designate the system as a depression until early on May 2 which was after the depression had made landfall on the Philippines. Later that day Dante was upgraded to a Tropical Storm and was named as Kujira by the JMA. The cyclone started to rapidly intensify becoming a typhoon early on May 4, and then reaching its peak winds of 155 km/h (100 mph) (10-min), 215 km/h (135 mph) (1-min) later that day after a small clear eye had developed.

Torrential rains produced by Typhoon Kujira in the Bicol Peninsula triggered severe flooding and mudslides which killed 27 people and 1 missing.

== Meteorological history ==
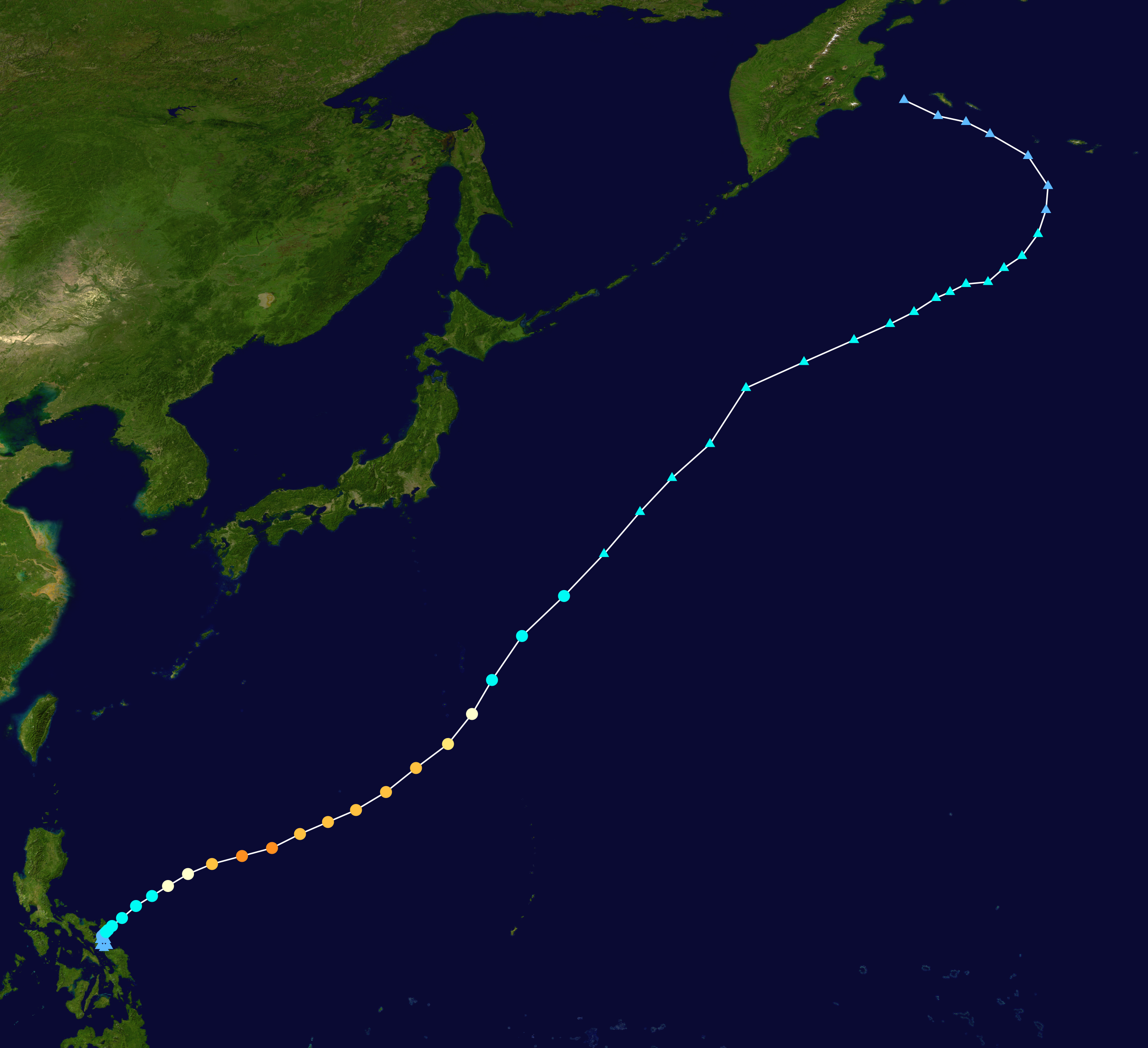
Map plotting the storm's track and intensity, according to the Saffir–Simpson scale Map key Saffir–Simpson scale Tropical depression (≤38 mph, ≤62 km/h) Tropical storm (39–73 mph, 63–118 km/h) Category 1 (74–95 mph, 119–153 km/h) Category 2 (96–110 mph, 154–177 km/h) Category 3 (111–129 mph, 178–208 km/h) Category 4 (130–156 mph, 209–251 km/h) Category 5 (≥157 mph, ≥252 km/h) Unknown Storm type Tropical cyclone Subtropical cyclone Extratropical cyclone, remnant low, tropical disturbance, or monsoon depression

On April 28, the Joint Typhoon Warning Center reported that an area of convection had persisted about 230 km (140 mi) to the northeast of Puerto Real in the Philippines. The disturbance had deep convection which was flaring in association with a mid level circulation center and was in an area of low vertical wind shear. However the disturbance then dissipated later that day. The disturbance then regenerated early on April 30, with a broad low level circulation center and was nestled within the islands of southern Luzon. An upper level anticyclone just to the northwest was enhancing pole ward outflow. During that day the disturbance developed further with improved convective banding in the northern quadrant, however interaction with land was a major hindrance. Early on May 1, the disturbance was designated as a Tropical Depression by the Philippine Atmospheric, Geophysical and Astronomical Services Administration (PAGASA) and the Japan Meteorological Agency, with PAGASA assigning the name Dante to the depression. Later that day PAGASA declared that Dante had made landfall on the Bicol Region in Southeastern Luzon. Early the next day the JTWC issued a Tropical Cyclone Formation Alert on the disturbance as whilst the low level circulation center had remained slow moving over southeastern Luzon the disturbance had a good outflow with convection starting to improve in terms of organization. Later that morning the JTWC designated the disturbance as Tropical Depression 01W. The Depression was being moved by the reverse oriented monsoon trough with a well formed low level circulation center with deep convective banding wrapping around the northern quadrant despite being close to land.

Later on May 2, both the JMA and the JTWC upgraded Dante to a Tropical Storm, with the JMA assigning the name of Kujira to the cyclone. During the next day Kujira quickly intensified due to favorable sea surface temperatures with the JMA upgrading it to a Severe Tropical Storm later that day, before becoming a Typhoon early on May 4 by both the JMA and the JTWC as animated infrared imagery was showing the development of an eye feature. Later that day both the JMA and the JTWC declared that Kujira had reached its peak wind speeds of 155 km/h (100 mph) (10-min) 215 km/h (135 mph) (1-min) after Kujira had formed a small round eye. PAGASA then released their final advisory as Typhoon Kujira had moved out of the eastern edge of their area of responsibility as the typhoon had started to weaken due to convective banding around the low level circulation center beginning to unravel. After moving out of PAGASA's area of responsibility Kujira continued to weaken as it developed a cloud filled eye with the cyclone starting its extra tropical transition during May 6. Early the next day the JTWC downgraded Kujira to a Tropical Storm, while the JMA downgraded the typhoon to a severe tropical storm, as it had rapidly lost its vertical organization and was beginning to take on frontal characteristics, a sign that the cyclone was becoming extratropical. As a result of this, the JTWC issued its final advisory on Kujira; however, the JMA kept issuing advisories on a weakening Kujira, until the agency downgraded it to an extratropical low later that day. The extratropical low that was Kujira was then tracked by the JMA, until early on May 13, when the JMA reported that Kujira had dissipated.

== Preparations ==
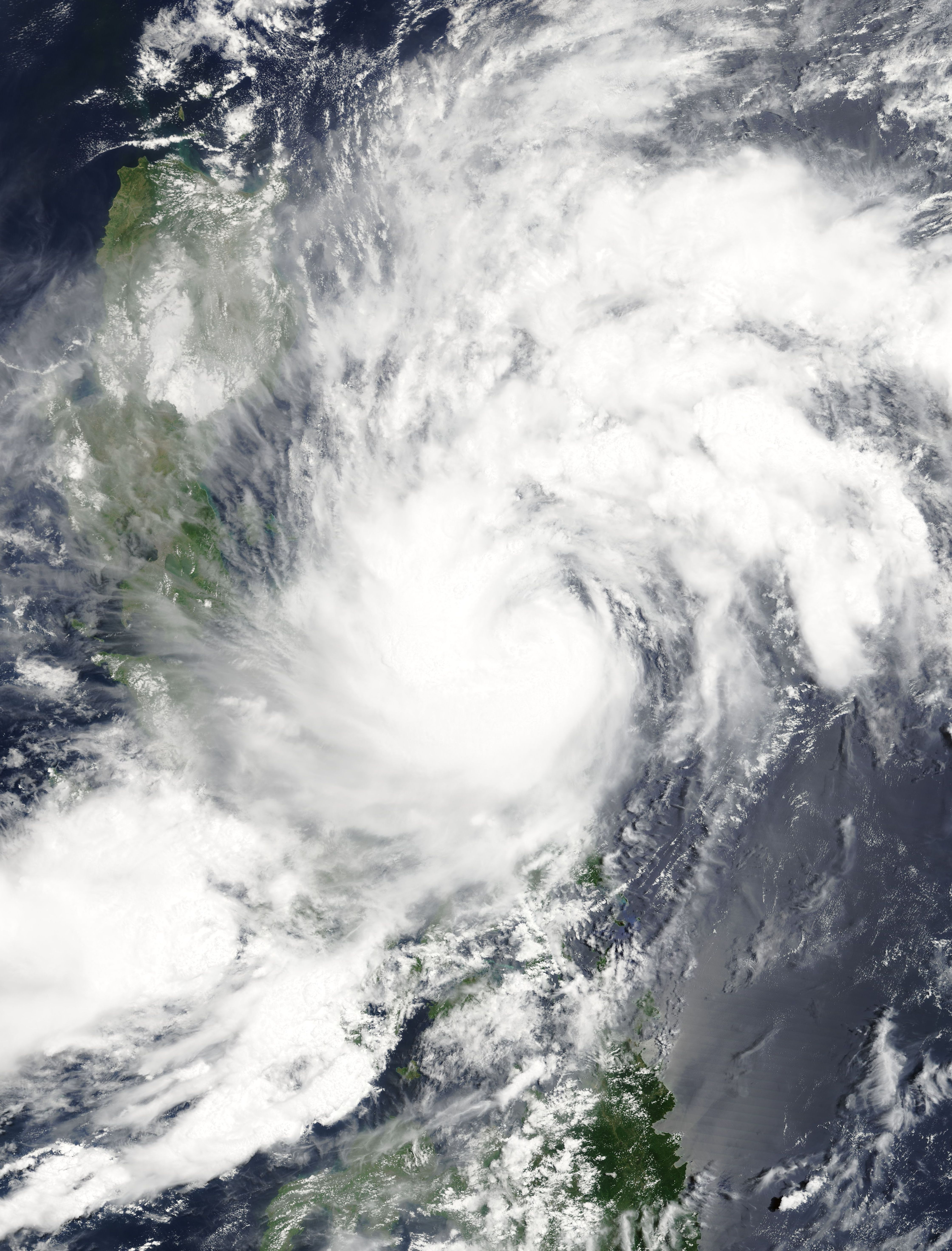
Tropical Storm Kujira affecting the Philippines on May 3

Early on May 1, PAGASA placed Camarines Norte, Camarines Sur, Albay, Sorsogon, Catanduanes, Masbate, Burias Island and Southern Quezon in Luzon and Northern Samar in Visayas, under Public Storm Warning Signal number 1 which meant that winds off 30–60 km/h (20-35 mph) were expected to affect the provinces within 36 hours. They kept the same eight provinces under public storm signal 1 until late the next day, when they placed the Catanduanes under Public Storm Warning Signal number 2, which meant that winds of 60–100 km/h (35-60 mph), were expected to affect the Catanduanes within 24 hours. They kept these signals up until later that day, when they lowered them for all provinces.

== Impact ==
While in the Philippine area of responsibility, Kujira caused some 625,709,464 worth of damage to crops and livestock in Albay, Camarines Norte, Masbate and Sorsogon. It also caused some 102 million pesos worth of damage to communal irrigation systems in the region. The NDCC damage report update as of 6am PST May 12 declared 28 dead, one missing and 5 injured. Further, 383,457 people in 609 barangays of 60 municipalities and 4 cities in 5 provinces of Region V were affected by the storm. A total of ₱686.3 million (US$14.3 million) was reported, with agricultural damage being ₱545.7 million and infrastructure damage being ₱140.7 million. Houses destroyed were at 2,387, of which 138 were total and 2,249 partial.

== Aftermath ==
President Arroyo instructed the local government to provide relief with water, foods, and clothes. In the aftermath of Kujira moving away from the Philippines, a state of calamity was declared in Albay, Camarines Sur and Sorsogon after 28 people had been killed and 8 had been injured. Over 3757 houses were damaged with 297 fully damaged.

== See also ==
- Other tropical storms named Kujira
- Other tropical storms named Dante
- Typhoon Chan-hom (2009)
- Typhoon Nida (2004)
- Typhoon Ewiniar (2024)
