= List of storms named Choi-wan =

The name Choi-wan (Cantonese: 彩雲, [t͡sʰɔːi˨˥ wɐn˨˩]) has been used for five tropical cyclones in the Western Pacific Ocean. The name was contributed by Hong Kong and literally means "colorful cloud" in Cantonese. It could also refer to Choi Wan Estate, a public estate in Hong Kong.

- Typhoon Choi-wan (2003) (T0315, 16W, Roskas) – paralleled the coast of Japan.
- Typhoon Choi-wan (2009) (T0914, 15W) – moved through the Northern Mariana Islands as a Category 5 super typhoon.
- Severe Tropical Storm Choi-wan (2015) (T1523, 23W) – a very large Category 1 typhoon that churned in the open ocean.
- Tropical Storm Choi-wan (2021) (T2103, 04W, Dante) - crossed the Philippines and later affected Taiwan.
- Typhoon Choi-wan (2026) (T2627, 26W) – a Category 5 super typhoon that churned in the open ocean.

| Preceded by Surigae | Pacific typhoon season names Choi-wan | Succeeded by Koguma |
