= List of storms named Koguma =

The name Koguma (Japanese: コグマ, [ko̞ɡɯ̟ma̠]) has been used for two tropical cyclones in the western North Pacific Ocean. The name was contributed by Japan and refers to the constellation Ursa Minor, the bear cub, in Japanese. It replaced the name Koppu, which was retired following the 2015 Pacific typhoon season.

- Tropical Storm Koguma (2021) (T2104, 05W) – a weak tropical cyclone that made landfall in Vietnam, causing minor damage.
- Typhoon Koguma (2026) (T2629, 27W) – a Category 4 typhoon that remained in the open ocean.

| Preceded by Choi-wan | Pacific typhoon season names Koguma | Succeeded by Champi |
