= 1980 Pacific typhoon season =

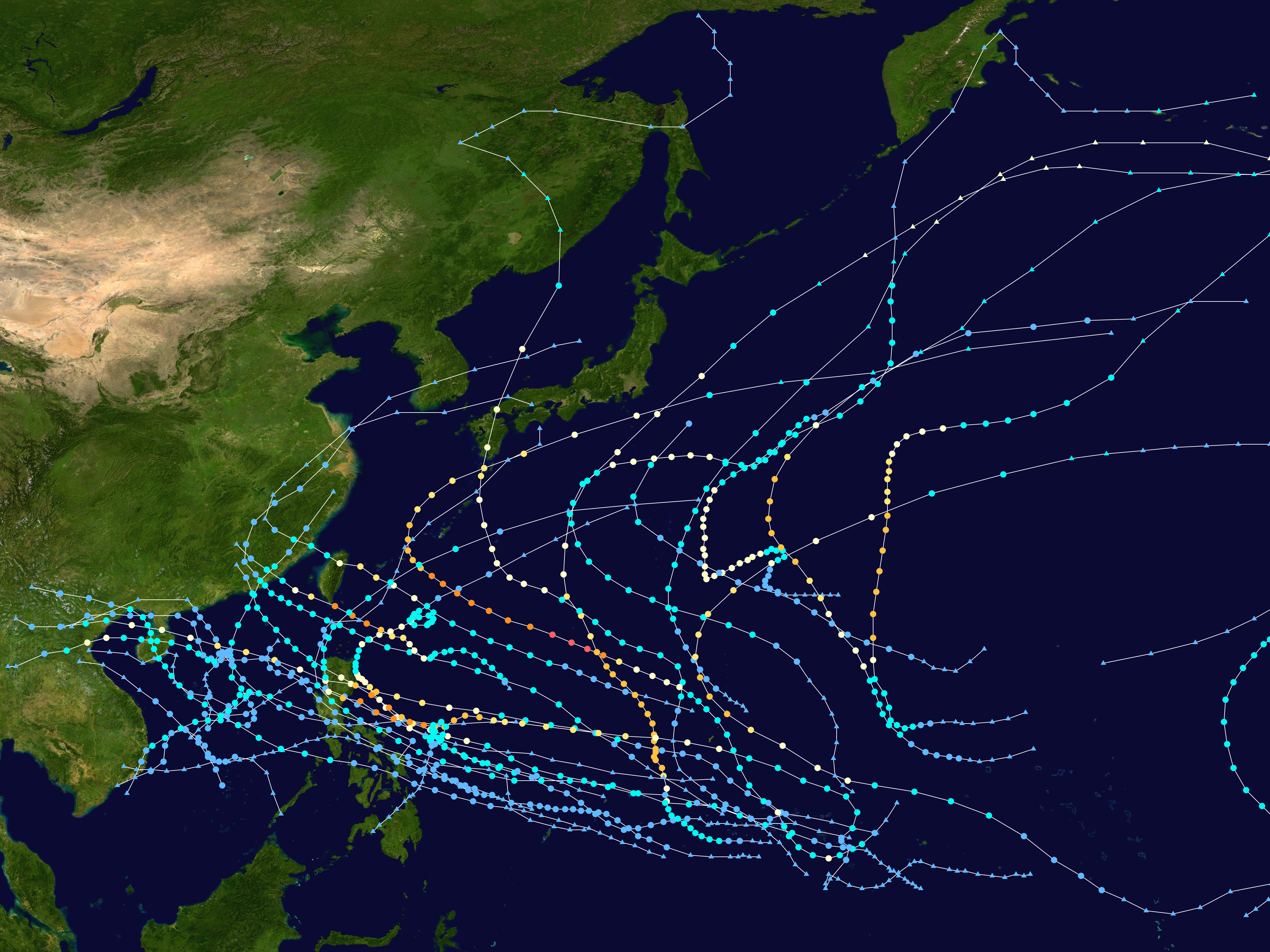
- Season summary map

Seasonal boundaries
- First system formed: February 12, 1980
- Last system dissipated: December 21, 1980

Strongest storm
- Name: Wynne
  - Maximum winds: 220 km/h (140 mph) (10-minute sustained)
  - Lowest pressure: 890 hPa (mbar)

Seasonal statistics
- Total depressions: 44
- Total storms: 24
- Typhoons: 15
- Very strong typhoons: 10
- Violent typhoons: 2
- Total fatalities: 493 total
- Total damage: $195 million (1980 USD)

Related articles
- 1980 Atlantic hurricane season; 1980 Pacific hurricane season; 1980 North Indian Ocean cyclone season

The 1980 Pacific typhoon season was a slightly-below average season when compared to the long-term average, though it featured several intense storms. It ran year-round in 1980, but most tropical cyclones formed between May and November. These dates conventionally delimit the period of each year when most tropical cyclones form in the northwestern Pacific Ocean. A total of 28 tropical depressions formed this year in the Western Pacific, of which 24 became tropical storms and were assigned a name by the Joint Typhoon Warning Center. Beginning in March, tropical cyclones formed in each subsequent month through December. Of the 24 named storms, 15 storms reached typhoon intensity, of which 2 reached super typhoon strength.

Additionally, tropical depressions that enter or form in the Philippine area of responsibility are assigned a name by the Philippine Atmospheric, Geophysical and Astronomical Services Administration or PAGASA. This can often result in the same storm having two names. This year, 23 storms were named this way.

== Seasonal summary ==
1980 season	Forecast Center	Tropical cyclones	Tropical storms	Typhoons	Ref.
Actual activity:	JMA	24	24	17	
Actual activity:	JTWC	28	24	16	
Actual activity:	PAGASA	22	Unknown	Unknown	

Thie 1980 Pacific typhoon season's ACE index was approximately 237.8 units, This number represents the sum of the squares of the maximum sustained wind speed (knots) for all tropical cyclones of at least tropical storm intensity, divided by 10,000. Therefore, tropical depressions are not included.

== Systems ==
=== Severe Tropical Storm Carmen ===
- Severe tropical storm (JMA)
- Tropical storm (SSHWS)
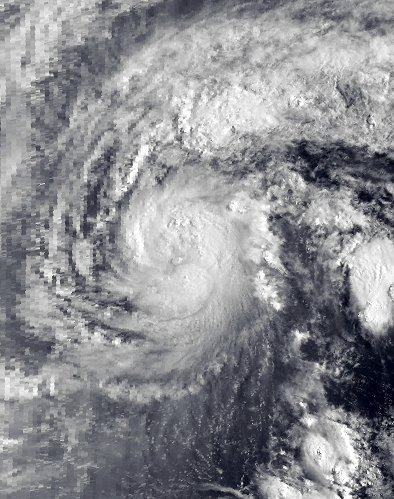
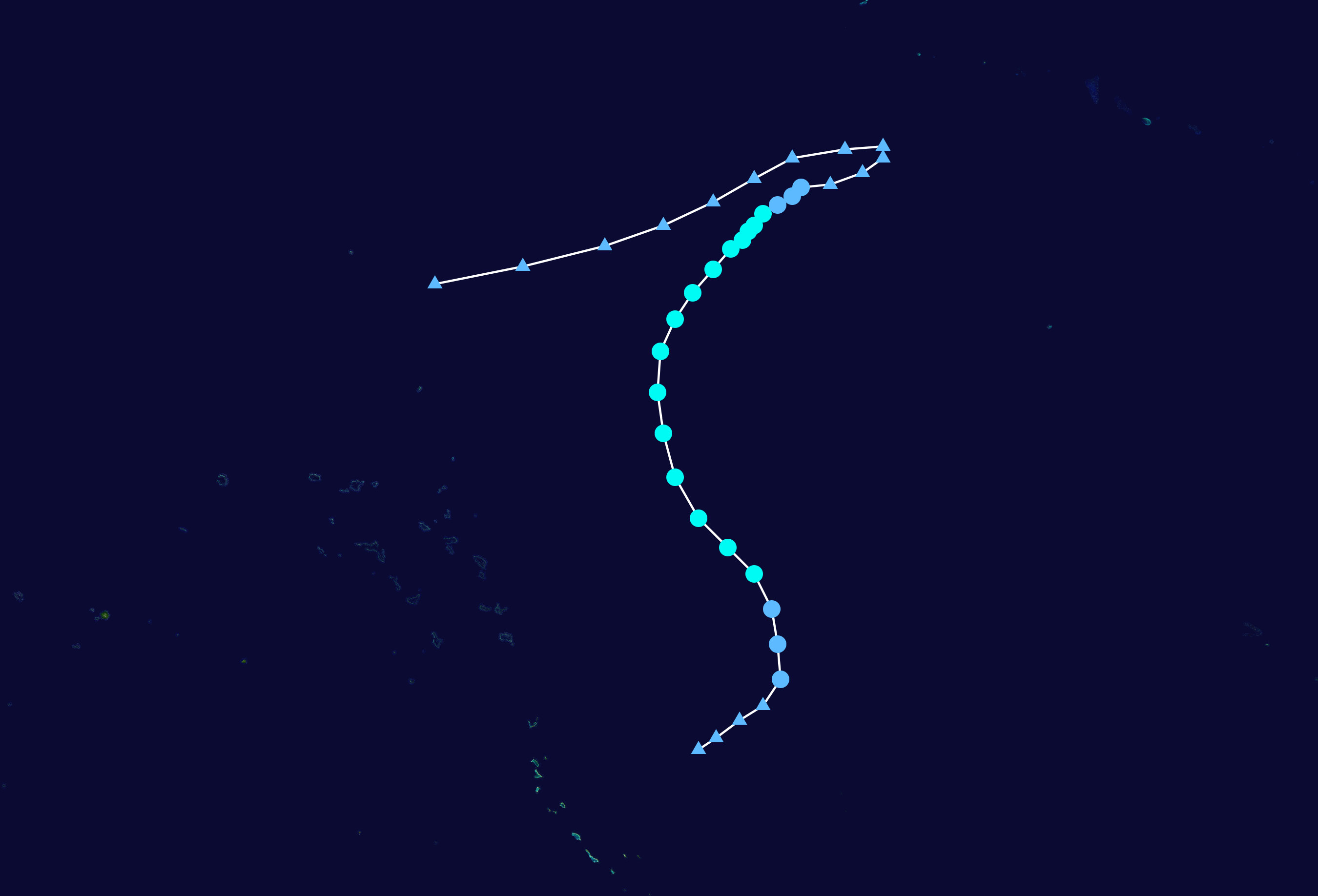
- Duration: April 5 (Entered basin) – April 7 (Exited basin)
- Peak intensity: 110 km/h (70 mph) (10-min); 985 hPa (mbar)

On 2 April, a tropical disturbance located east of the International Date Line began developing alongside a parallel cyclone, the precursor to Cyclone Wally, both inside the near-equatorial trough. Steadily tracking west, later that day, Carmen intensified into a tropical storm. A few hours later, as the system crossed east of the Date Line on 5 April, the JTWC issued their first warning on the system. Later that day, the JMA designated the system as a tropical storm, with the JTWC following suit a few hours later, naming it Carmen. Steadily intensifying, the next day, both the JTWC and JMA stated that Carmen peaked with sustained winds of 60 knots (110 km/h; 70 mph). Soon after, Carmen steadily weakened, and after tracking east of the Date Line on 7 April, both the JTWC and JMA stopped tracking the system.

=== Typhoon Dom (Ditang) ===
- Very strong typhoon (JMA)
- Category 2 typhoon (SSHWS)
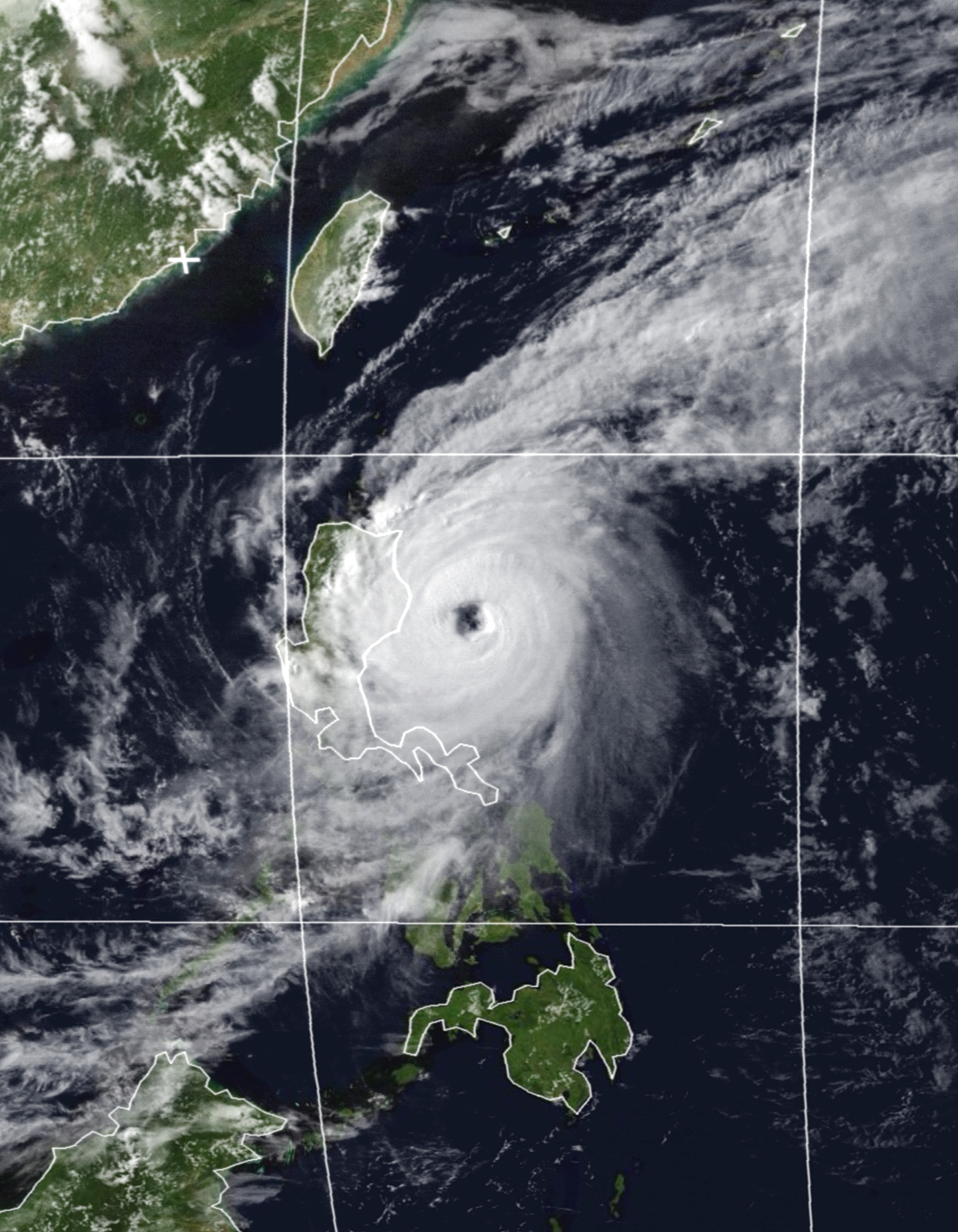
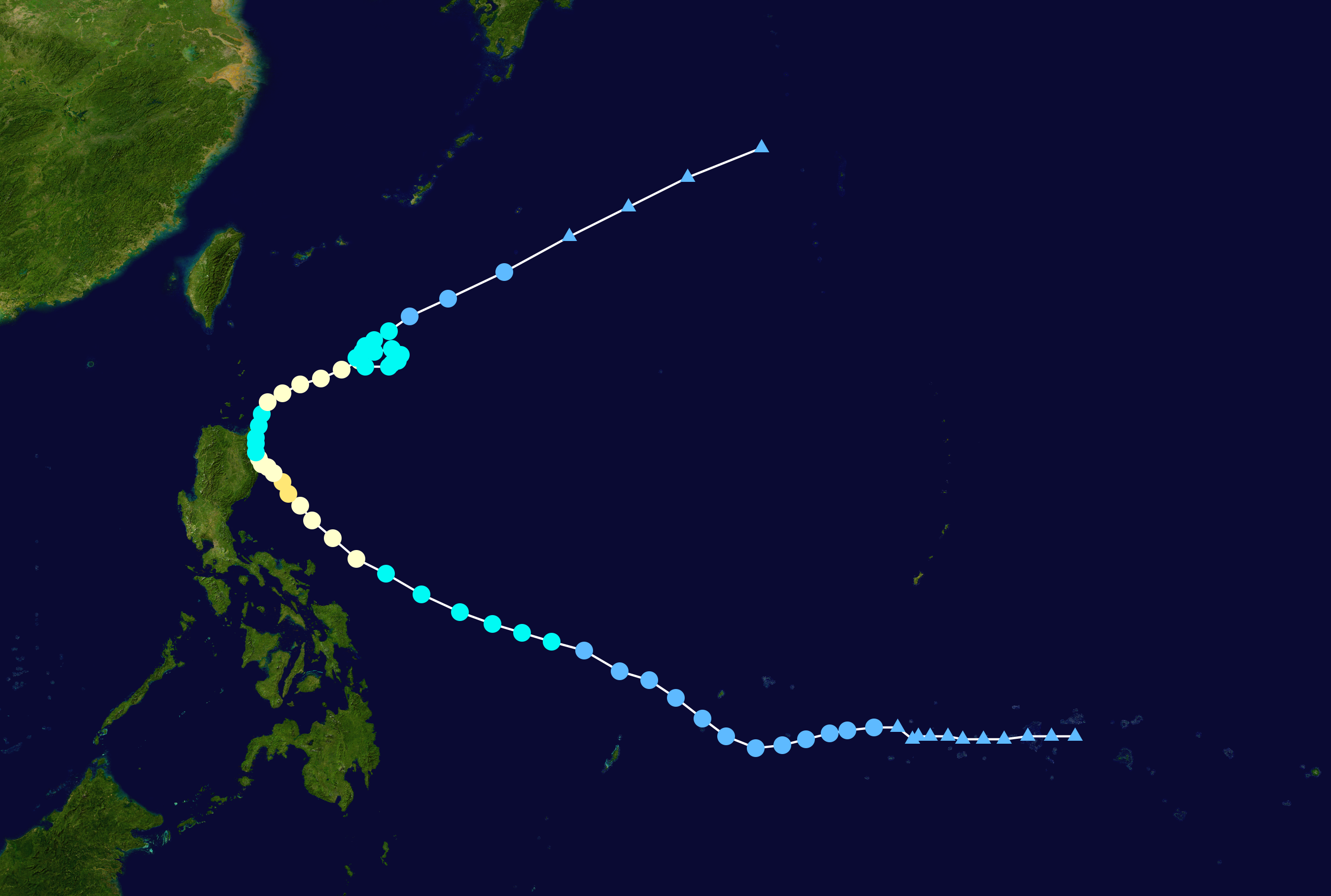
- Duration: May 7 – May 22
- Peak intensity: 155 km/h (100 mph) (10-min); 960 hPa (mbar)

On 5 May, a weak tropical disturbance began developing in the near-equatorial trough. As it tracked westward across the Caroline Islands in the following three days, little development was seen. Despite that, on May 7, the Japan Meteorological Agency designated the disturbance as a tropical depression. The next day, an uptick in convective activity prompted the JTWC to issue a TCFA on the system, which was south of Guam. As the circulation steadily organized, the JTWC upgraded the system into a tropical depression. Two days later, the depression crossed into the Philippine Area of Responsibility (PAR), causing the Philippine Atmospheric, Geophysical, and Astronomical Services Administration (PAGASA) to name it Ditang. Despite intense vertical shear, the depression intensified into a tropical storm a few hours later, being named Dom by the JTWC. After the wind shear relaxed, on May 11, the JTWC stated that Dom had intensified into a typhoon, with the JMA following suit the next day. Soon after, Dom began weakening due to the mountainous terrain of Luzon, becoming a tropical storm on May 14. However, as Dom traced eastward, the next day, it re-intensified into a typhoon.

After this secondary peak, a combination of colder SSTs and unfavorable atmospheric conditions caused the system to steadily weaken, and after doing an anticyclonic loop, on May 18, Dom weakened into a tropical storm. The next day, the JTWC issued their last advisory on Dom, declaring that it had degenerated into a post-tropical cyclone. PAGASA kept tracking the system until May 21, when the remnants of Dom and a weakening Ellen began accelerating towards an extratropical cyclone south of Japan. The remnants of Dom and Ellen later merged with the cyclone the same day, causing the JMA to finally stop monitoring Dom a few hours later.

As Ditang tracked towards the Philippines, PAGASA issued Public Storm Warning Signal (PSWS) #3 for Catanduanes, Camarines Norte and Sur, Aurora, Quirino, Cagayan, Mountain Province, Nueva Vizcaya, Ifugao, Batanes, and Abra. Heavy rains and gusts were seen in Eastern Luzon. As a result of the typhoon, Baguio received 730.3 mm (28.75 in) of rain on May 15. At least four provinces suffered a loss of tobacco crops. In total, Ditang resulted in 3,696 homes being damaged and ₱2.4 million (US$320,000) in damage.

=== Typhoon Ellen ===
- Violent typhoon (JMA)
- Category 3 typhoon (SSHWS)
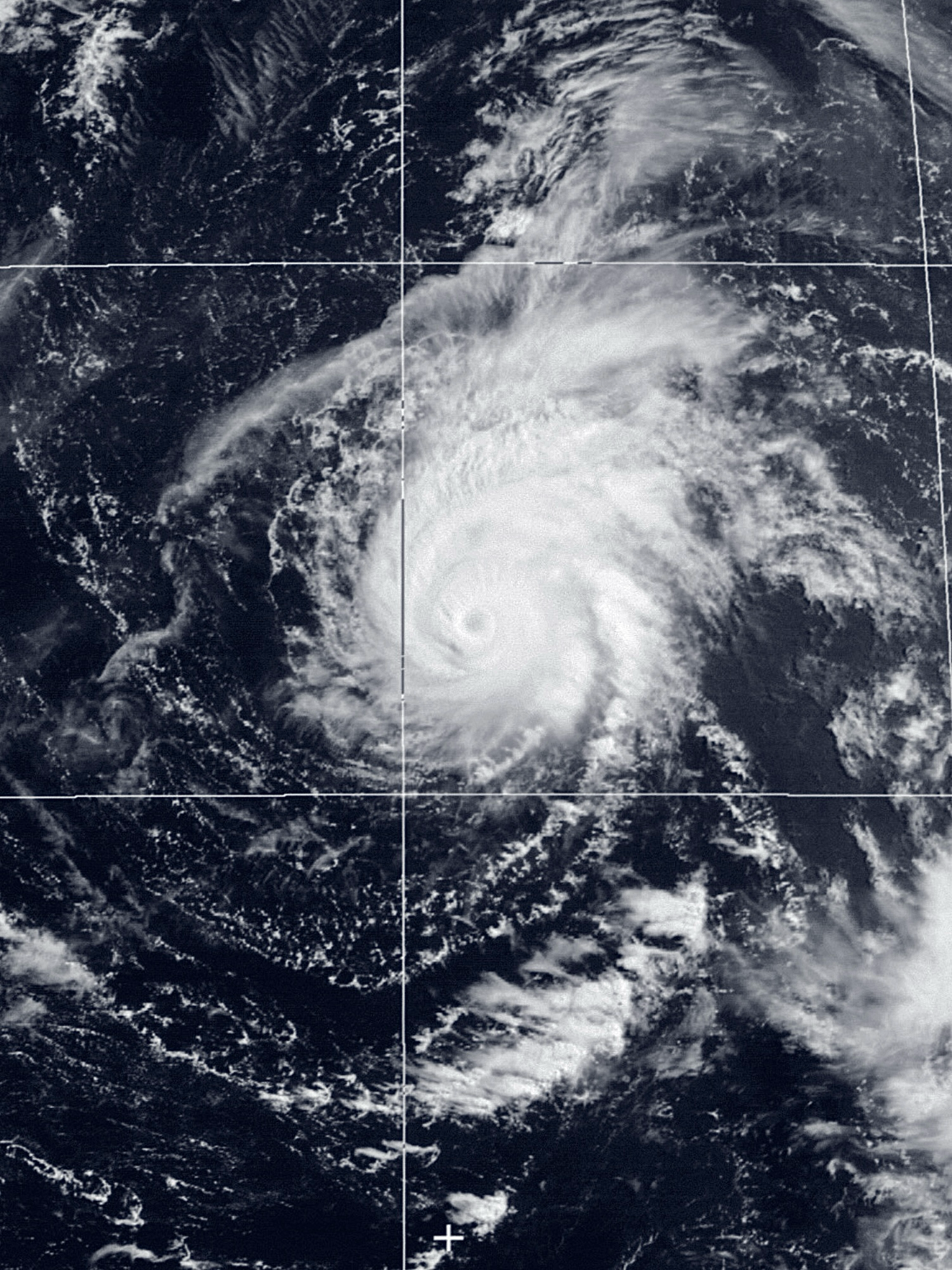
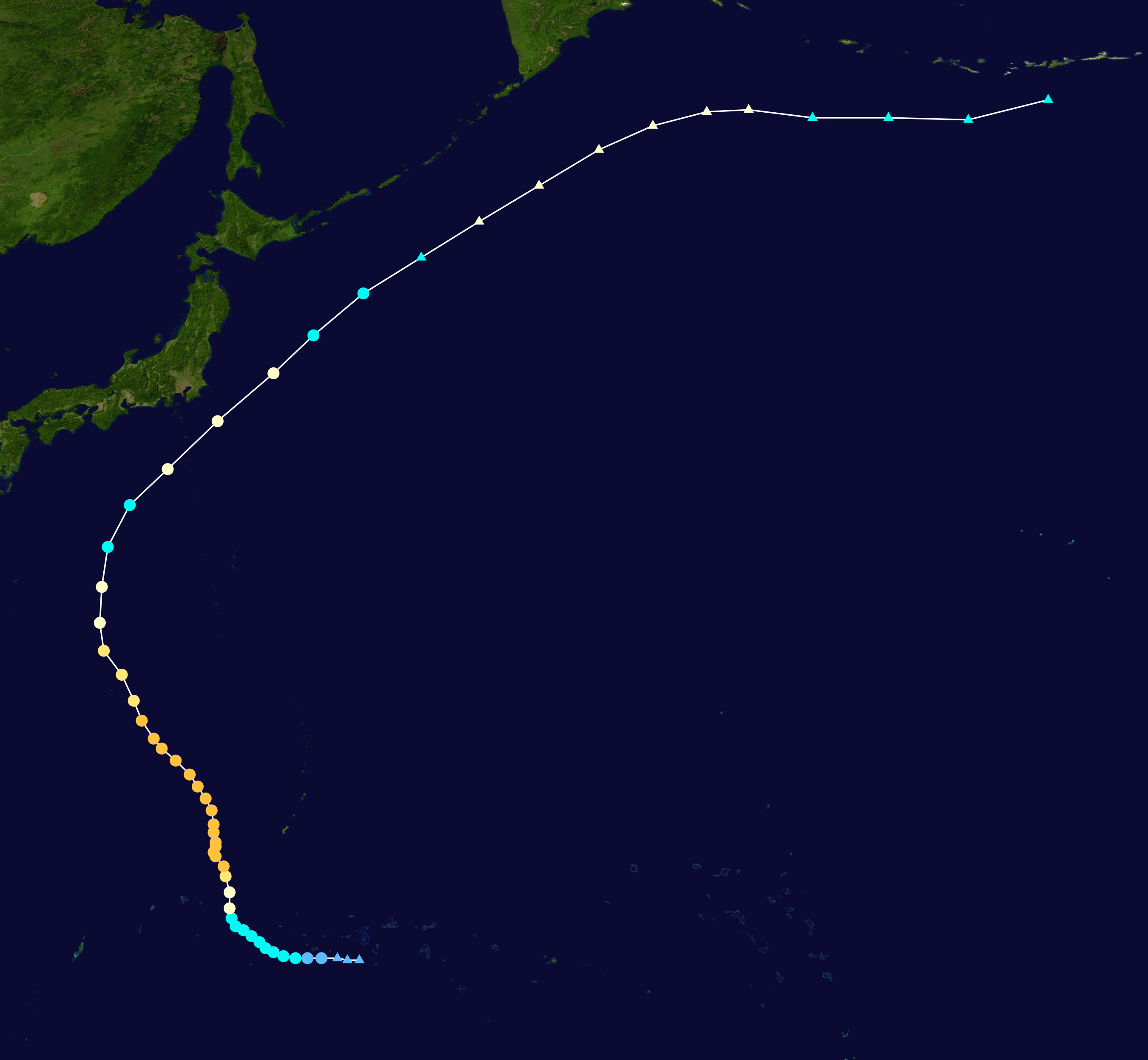
- Duration: May 13 – May 25
- Peak intensity: 195 km/h (120 mph) (10-min); 930 hPa (mbar)

On 11 May, a tropical disturbance located in an equatorial trough east of Chuuk Lagoon began developing. Despite initially showing signs of weakening, the next day, it rapidly developed, becoming a tropical storm a few hours later, causing both the JTWC and JMA to issue their first advisories early on 13 May, with the former naming it Ellen. Slightly weakening for a few hours, on May 15, Ellen rapidly intensified, becoming a typhoon a few hours later. Soon after, Ellen deepened significantly, reaching a minimum pressure of 930 mbar (27 inHg) later that day. The next day, the JMA noted that Ellen had peaked with 10-minute sustained winds of 105 kn (120 mph; 195 km/h) while the JTWC stated that Ellen peaked with 1-minute sustained winds of 110 kn (125 mph; 205 km/h). Shortly after, Ellen began recurving northwest towards Japan, weakening as it neared the extratropical cyclone which absorbed Dom. On 21 May, Ellen merged with the cyclone, causing the JTWC to stop tracking it. The JMA kept tracking it until 25 May.

As Ellen made its closest approach to Japan, Yokosuka saw gusts of 30–35 kn (35–40 mph; 56–65 km/h). Heavy rainfall from Ellen affected western and central Japan, causing around 60 landslides and flooding almost 300 homes.

=== Severe Tropical Storm Forrest (Gloring) ===
- Severe tropical storm (JMA)
- Tropical storm (SSHWS)
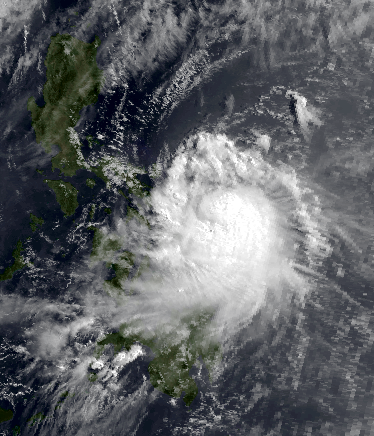
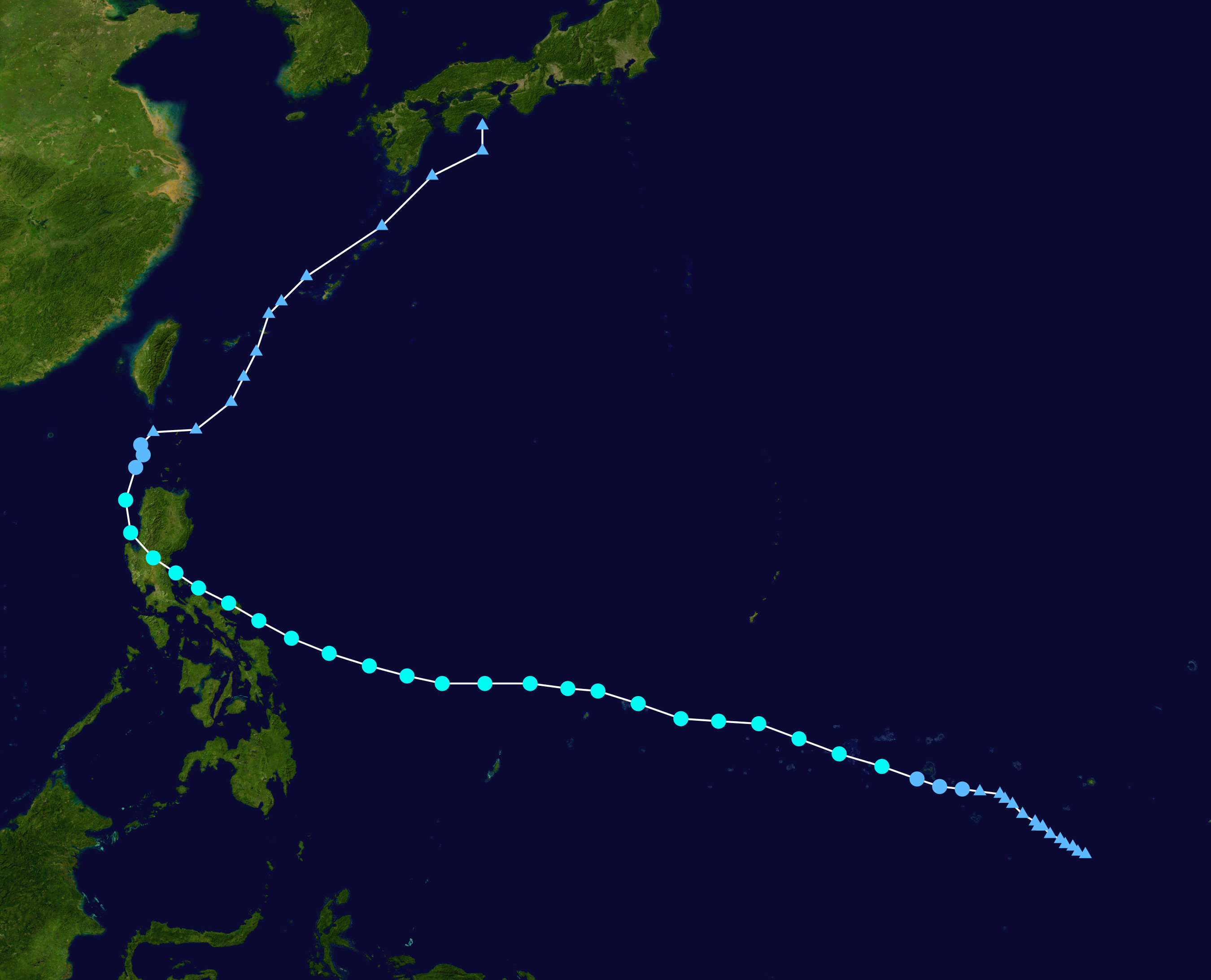
- Duration: May 19 – May 29
- Peak intensity: 100 km/h (65 mph) (10-min); 992 hPa (mbar)

On 16 May, a tropical disturbance began developing west of Kosrae. Three days later, the JMA designated the disturbance as a tropical depression, with the JTWC issuing a TCFA on the system just a few hours after. The next day, both the JMA and JTWC designated the depression as a tropical storm, with the latter agency naming it Forrest. On 22 May, Forrest crossed into the PAR, being named Gloring by PAGASA. Steadily developing, the next day, both the JMA and JTWC noted that Forest had peaked with sustained winds of 55 kn (65 mph; 100 km/h). After making landfall in Luzon on 25 May, Forrest rapidly weakened, and on 26 May, both PAGASA and the JTWC stopped tracking Forrest. The JMA kept tracking a weakening Forrest until it dissipated on 29 May. In the Philippines, damage from the storm totaled to ₱900,000 (US$120,000).

=== Severe Tropical Storm Georgia (Edeng) ===
- Severe tropical storm (JMA)
- Tropical storm (SSHWS)
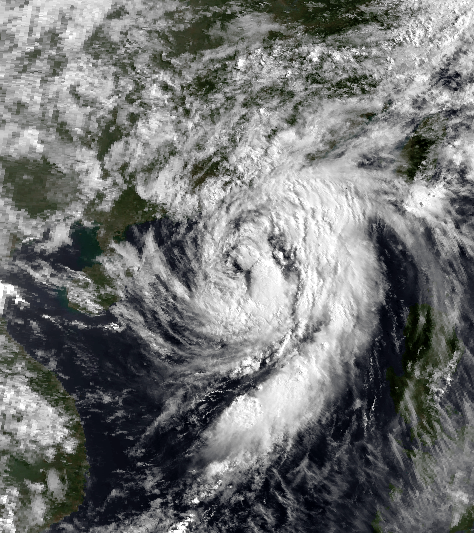
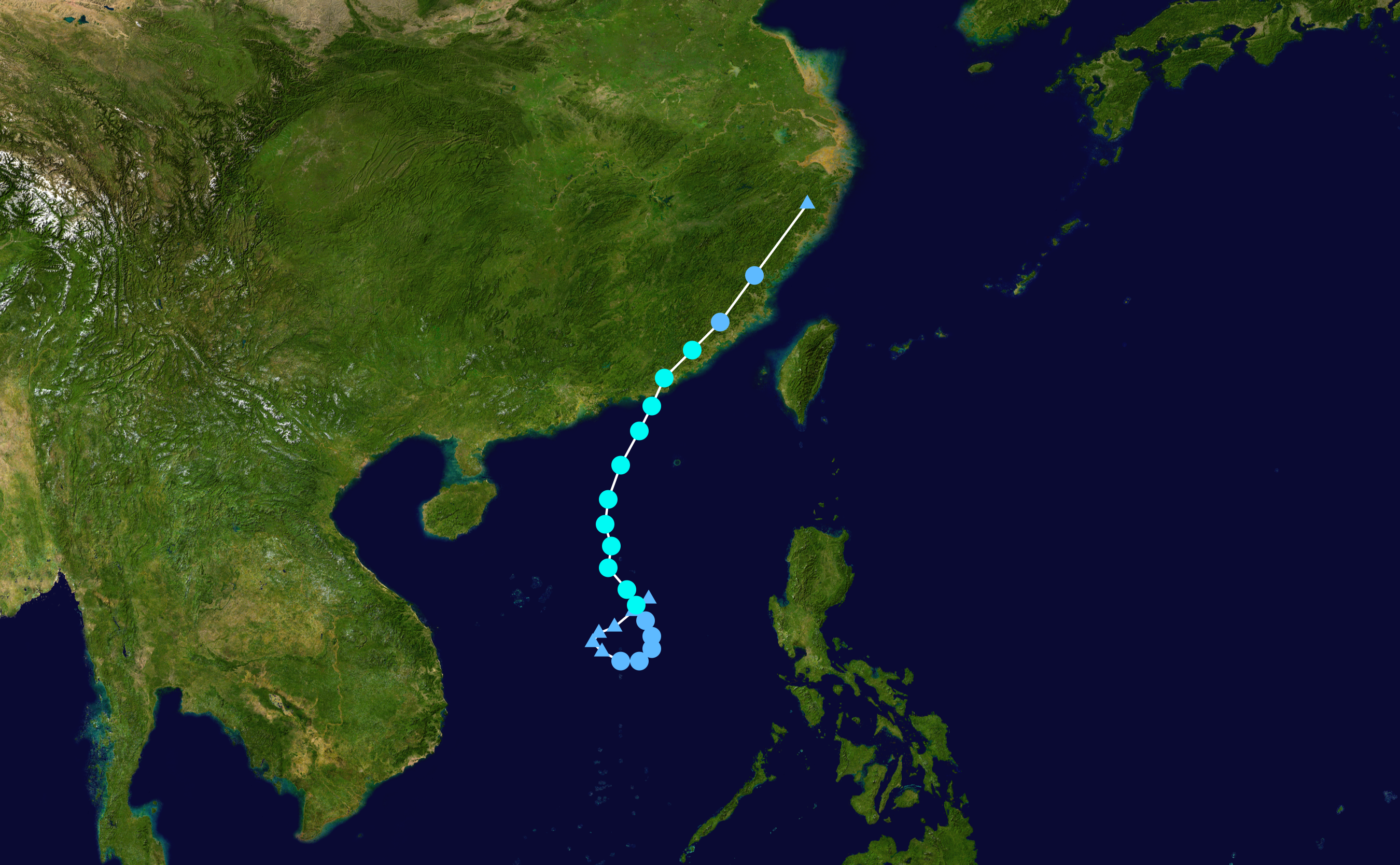
- Duration: May 19 – May 25
- Peak intensity: 100 km/h (65 mph) (10-min); 980 hPa (mbar)

On 19 May, a monsoon depression embedded in the South China sea began developing. A few hours later, the JMA designated the weak circulation as a tropical depression, while the JTWC issued a TCFA on it. Barely developing, on 21 May, the system began featuring some convective activity, causing the JTWC and PAGASA to designate the system as a depression, with the latter agency naming it Edeng. The next day, Edeng left the PAR, causing PAGASA to stop tracking the system. Soon after, both the JMA and JTWC designated the system as a tropical storm, with the latter naming it Georgia. After making landfall in Shantou on 23 May with sustained winds of 55 kn (65 mph; 100 km/h), Georgia rapidly weakened, causing the JTWC to stop monitoring it the next day. The JMA followed suit the next day.

As Georgia made its closest approach to Hong Kong, some stations recorded intense gusts, with Stanley recording a gust of 73 kn (84 mph; 135 km/h). Additionally, light rainfall was seen. With the exception of some scaffolding blown off in Tai Kok Sui Road, no damage occurred.

=== Severe Tropical Storm Herbert (Huaning) ===
- Severe tropical storm (JMA)
- Tropical storm (SSHWS)
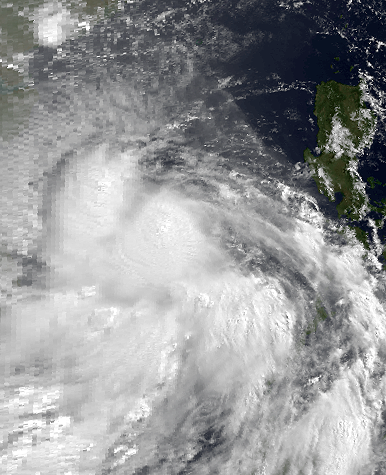
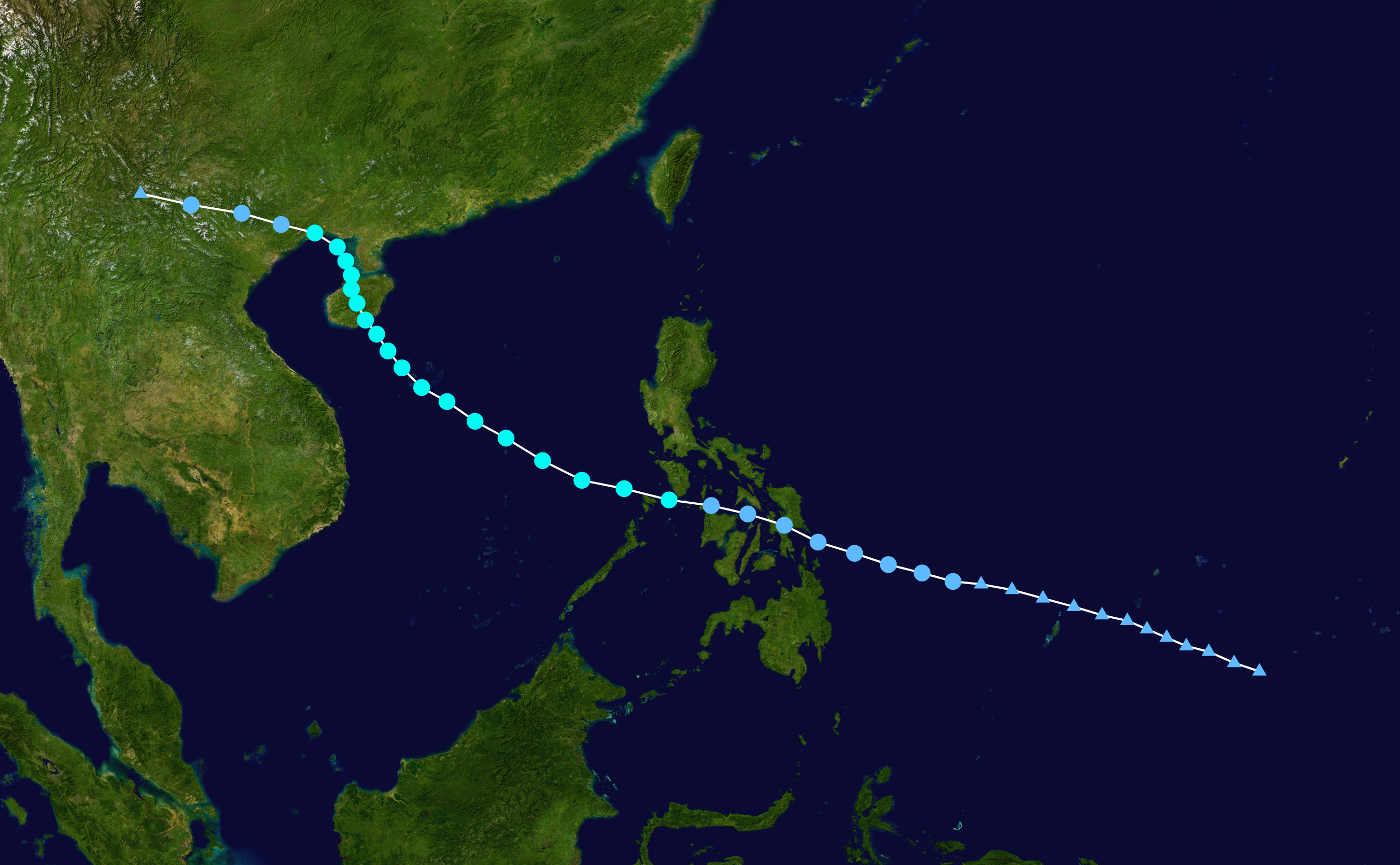
- Duration: June 22 – June 29
- Peak intensity: 95 km/h (60 mph) (10-min); 990 hPa (mbar)

In mid-June, an equatorial trough was active, stretching from the Philippines to the eastern Caroline Islands near the equator. On 20 June, satellite imagery indicated increased convective activity around the eastern periphery of the trough as a result of convergent easterly flow. As a result, a TCFA was issued on the area of convective activity. The next day, the disturbance was designated a depression by PAGASA, who named it Huaning. Making landfall in Leyte, Philippines the next day, the JMA designated the system as a tropical depression. However, landfall prevented further development, causing the TCFA to be cancelled later that day. However, after tracking westwards for several days, on 24 June, the JTWC reissued a TCFA. Several hours later, both the JTWC and JMA designated Huaning as a tropical storm, with the former agency naming it Herbert.

In the South China Sea, Herbert tracked northwestward toward Hainan Island while intensifying slowly. After exiting the PAR on 25 June, PAGASA stopped tracking the system. Later that day, both agencies stated that Herbert peaked with sustained winds of 50 kn (60 mph; 95 km/h). Slightly weakening, at 1800Z the next day, Herbert made its landfall in Hainan with maximum sustained winds of 45 kn (50 mph; 85 km/h). After tracking into the Gulf of Tonkin, on 28 June, Herbert made its second landfall in Móng Cái, Quảng Ninh Province with sustained winds of 45 kn (50 mph; 85 km/h). Rapidly weakening, both the JTWC and JMA stopped tracking Herbert the next day.

As Herbert made its closest approach to Hong Kong, some stations recorded moderate gales, with Tate's Cairn recording a gust of 48 kn (55 mph; 89 km/h). Additionally, heavy rainfall was seen, flooding some roads and causing landslides. Two men died after their helicopter crashed into the slopes of Tai Mo Shan. The Paracel Islands recorded peak winds of 46 kn (53 mph; 85 km/h).

=== Typhoon Ida (Lusing) ===
- Typhoon (JMA)
- Tropical storm (SSHWS)
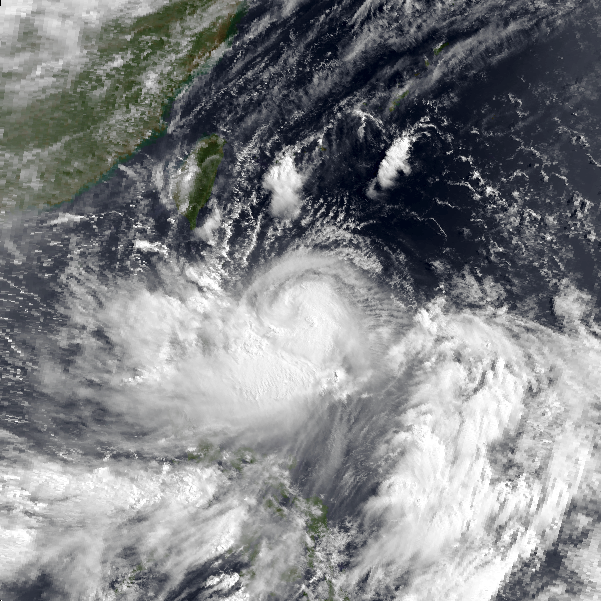
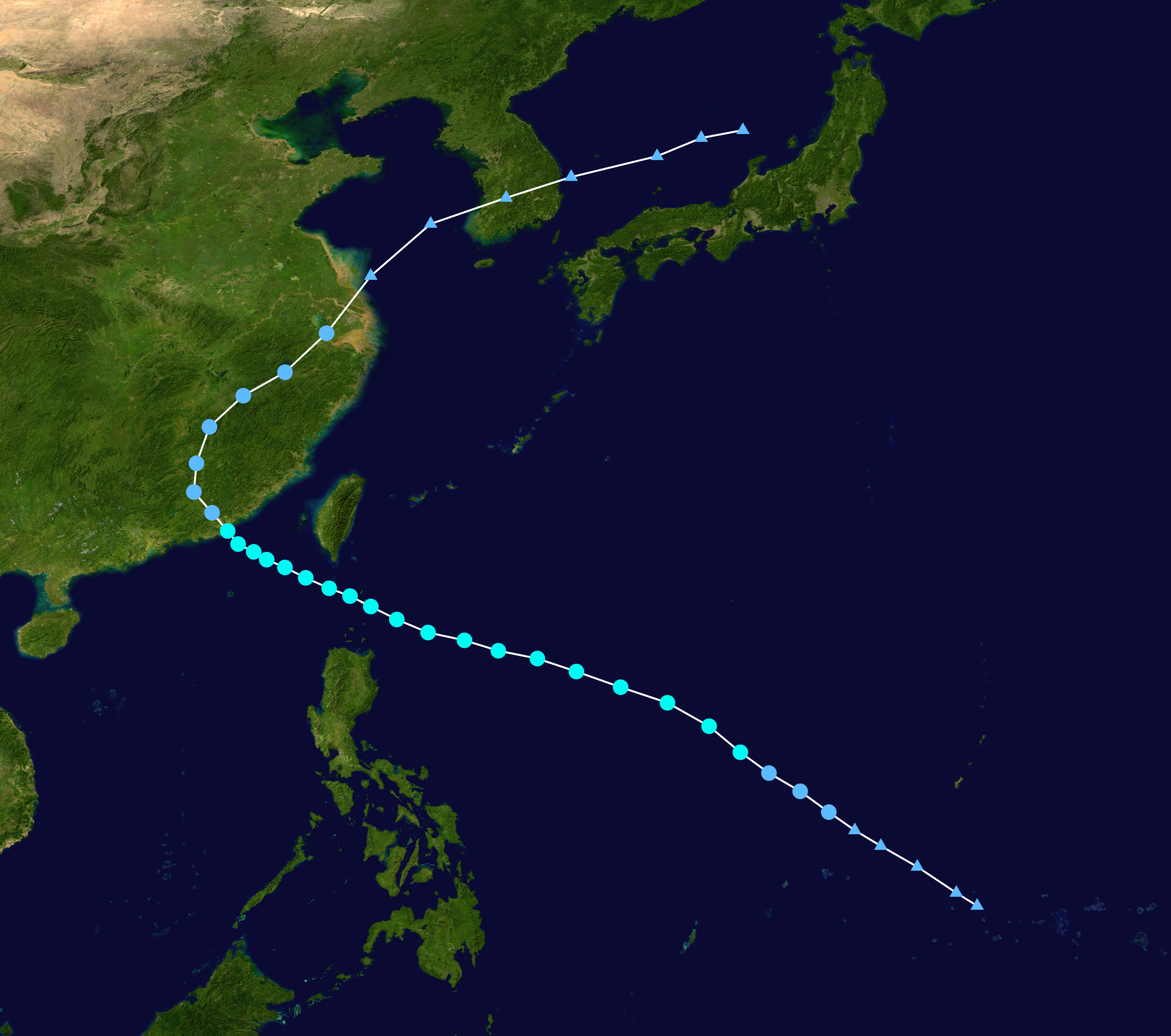
- Duration: July 5 – July 15
- Peak intensity: 130 km/h (80 mph) (10-min); 980 hPa (mbar)

On 5 July, a surface circulation began developing northwest of the Caroline islands. Later that day, the JMA designated the system as a tropical depression. Aerial reconnaissance caused the JTWC to issue a TCFA, and a few hours later, they designated the system as a tropical depression. The next day, the system intensified into a tropical storm, causing PAGASA to name the system Lusing as it was in the PAR, while the JTWC named it Ida. Steadily intensifying, on 9 July, the JMA stated that Ida peaked as a minimal typhoon while the JTWC stated that it peaked as a high-end tropical storm. Slightly weakening as it tracked into the Bashi Channel, on 11 July, Ida made landfall in Southeastern China, causing PAGASA to stop tracking it. The JMA stopped tracking the system four days later.

As Ida was developing, the naval air station in Guam received over 1.15 in (29 mm) of rainfall in three hours. Moderate rainfall was recorded in Hong Kong. In the Philippines, damage totaled to ₱7 million (US$932,000).

=== Typhoon Joe (Nitang) ===
- Very strong typhoon (JMA)
- Category 3 typhoon (SSHWS)
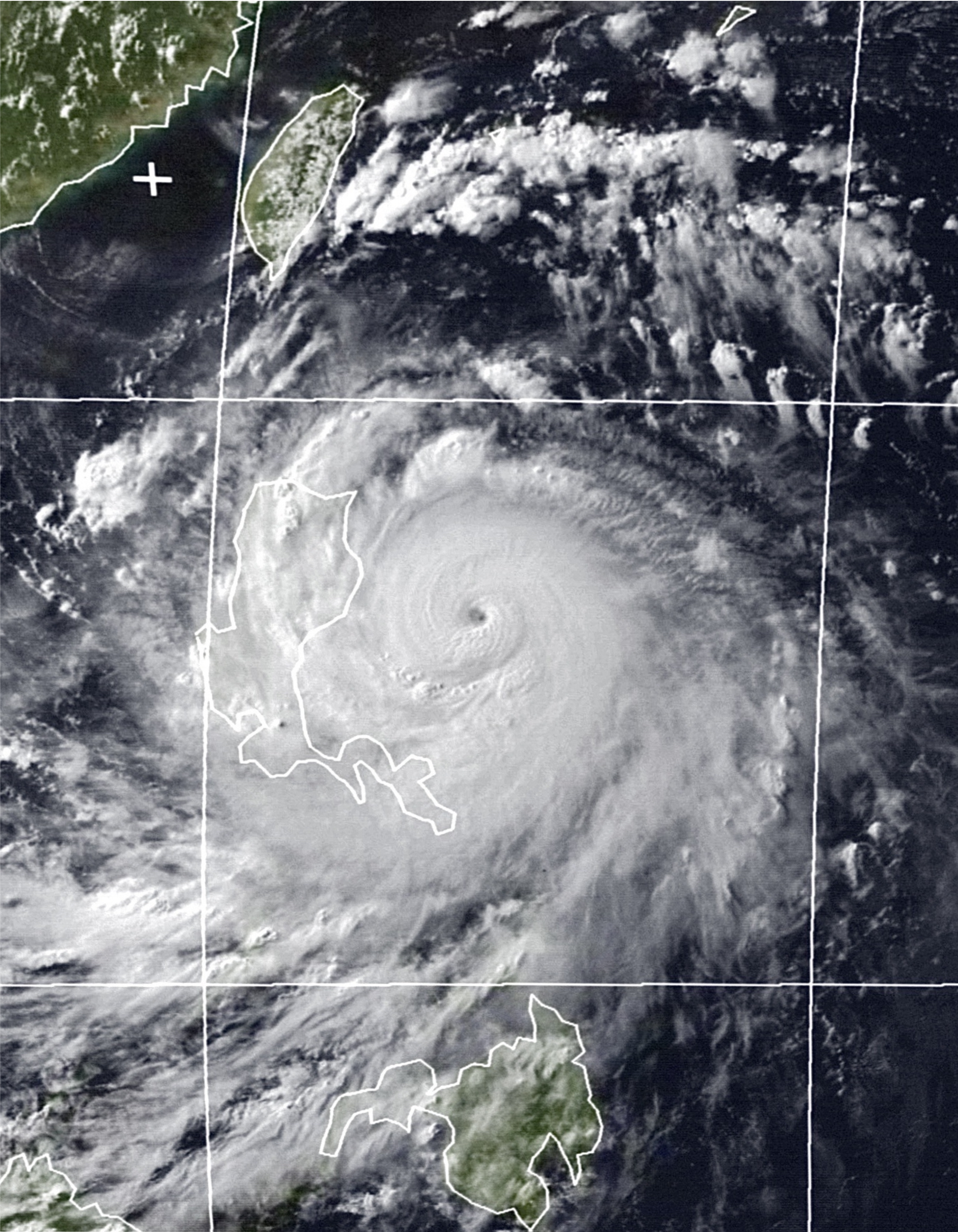
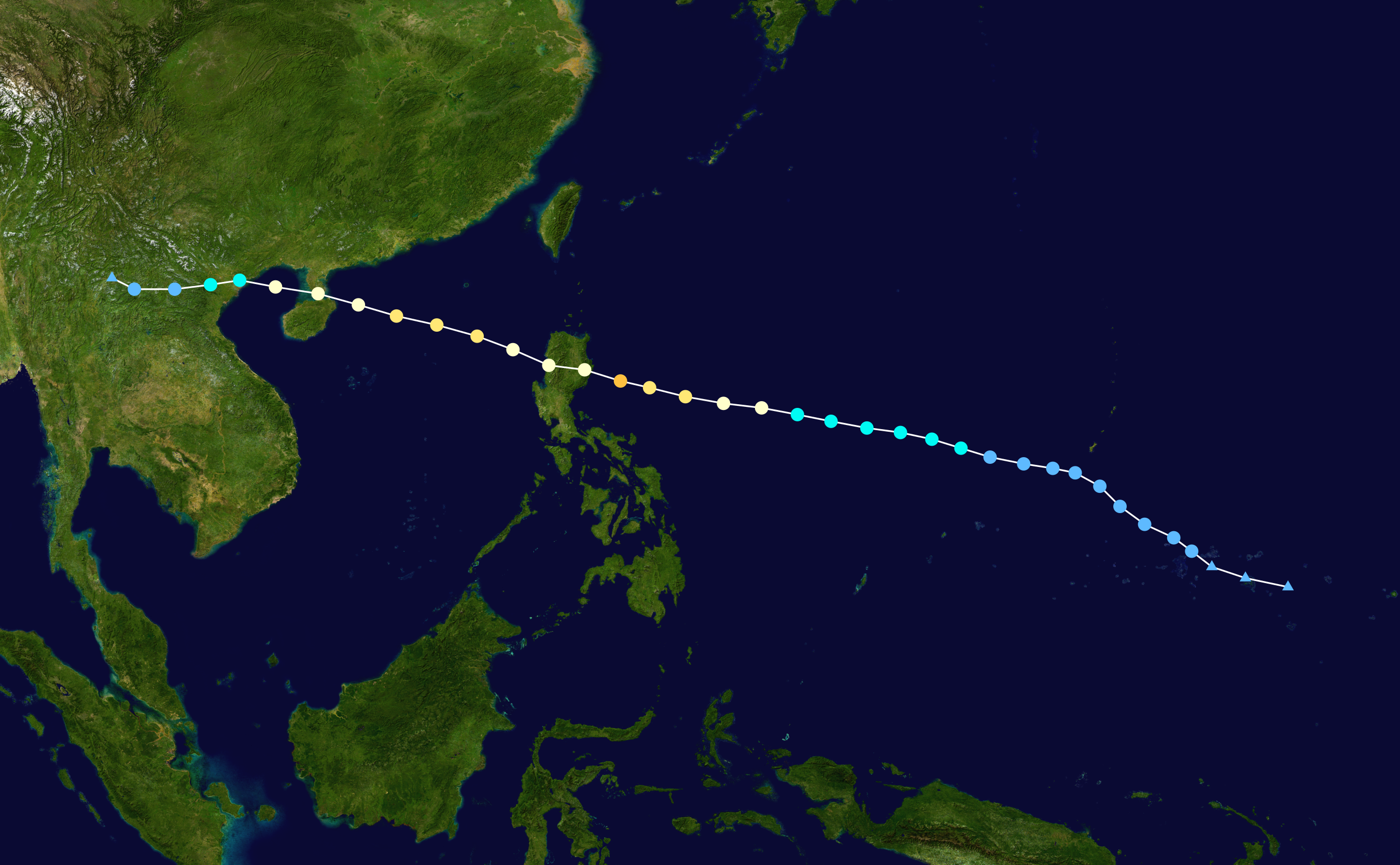
- Duration: July 15 – July 24
- Peak intensity: 155 km/h (100 mph) (10-min); 940 hPa (mbar)

An area of disturbed weather developed over the Caroline Islands on July 14. Tracking westward, convective activity gradually increased in both convection and coverage. At 18:00 UTC on July 22, the Japan Meteorological Agency (JMA) started tracking the system. By 00:00 UTC on July 17, the surface center and the deep convection moved closer together, prompting the JTWC to classify the system as a tropical depression. Meanwhile, PAGASA tracked the storm and named it Nitang.

The depression began to develop at a quicker pace, and early on July 18, the JTWC upgraded it to a tropical storm. After Joe developed a central dense overcast, the JMA upgraded Joe into a severe tropical storm. At midday, the JTWC and JMA upgraded Joe into a typhoon. This intensity estimate was confirmed by a Hurricane hunter plane later on July 19, which measured a pressure of 974 mbar (28.8 inHg). An eye began to clear out on July 20. That same day, a Hurricane hunter aircraft recorded a pressure of 940 mbar (28 inHg). At midday, the JTWC estimated that Joe peaked in intensity, with winds of 195 km/h (120 mph), equal to a Category 3 hurricane on the United States-based Saffir-Simpson Hurricane Wind Scale (SSHWS). Meanwhile, the JMA estimated maximum intensity of 160 km/h (100 mph).

Six hours after its peak, Joe made landfall in central Luzon. At the time of landfall, the JMA indicated winds of 90 mph (145 km/h). Over land, Joe weakened rapidly, falling to tropical storm strength according to the JTWC. After entering the South China Sea on July 21, Joe began to re-intensify; data from the JTWC suggested that Joe regained typhoon intensity almost immediately thereafter. Around this time, the JMA estimated that Joe reached its secondary peak of 135 km/h (85 mph). On July 22, the JTWC estimated that Joe attained a secondary peak of 170 km/h (105 mph). Despite maintaining its structure as it tracked over the Leizhou Peninsula, the storm weakened as it entered the Gulf of Tonkin and approached the coast of Vietnam. Both the JTWC and JMA agree that Joe had winds of 130 km/h (80 mph) when it moved ashore near Haiphong in Vietnam later on July 22. A combination of land interaction and vertical wind shear resulted in rapid weakening. At 00:00 UTC on July 23, the JTWC issued its last warning on Joe. The remnants of Joe later moved into Laos. The JMA stopped watching Joe on July 24.

Across the Philippines, 31 citizens were killed, In Vietnam, 130 people were killed, 300,000 others were directly affected, and 165,000 others lost their homes. Two large ships, a 20,000 short tons (18,145 t) liner and a 50,000 short tons (45,360 t) tanker, were washed ashore in Chankiang. Throughout the area, 188 people were killed and at least 100 others were left homeless.

=== Typhoon Kim (Osang) ===
- Very strong typhoon (JMA)
- Category 4 super typhoon (SSHWS)
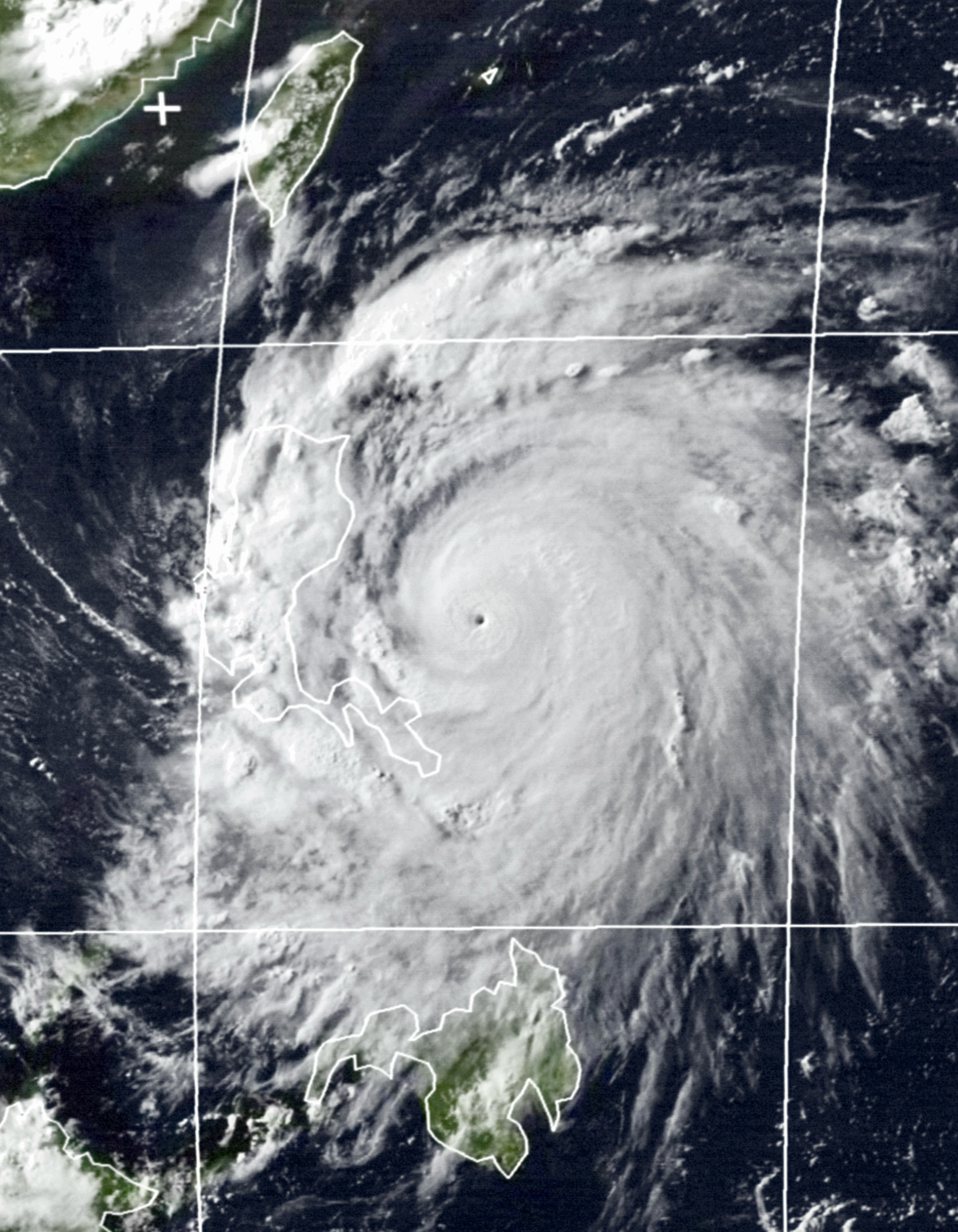
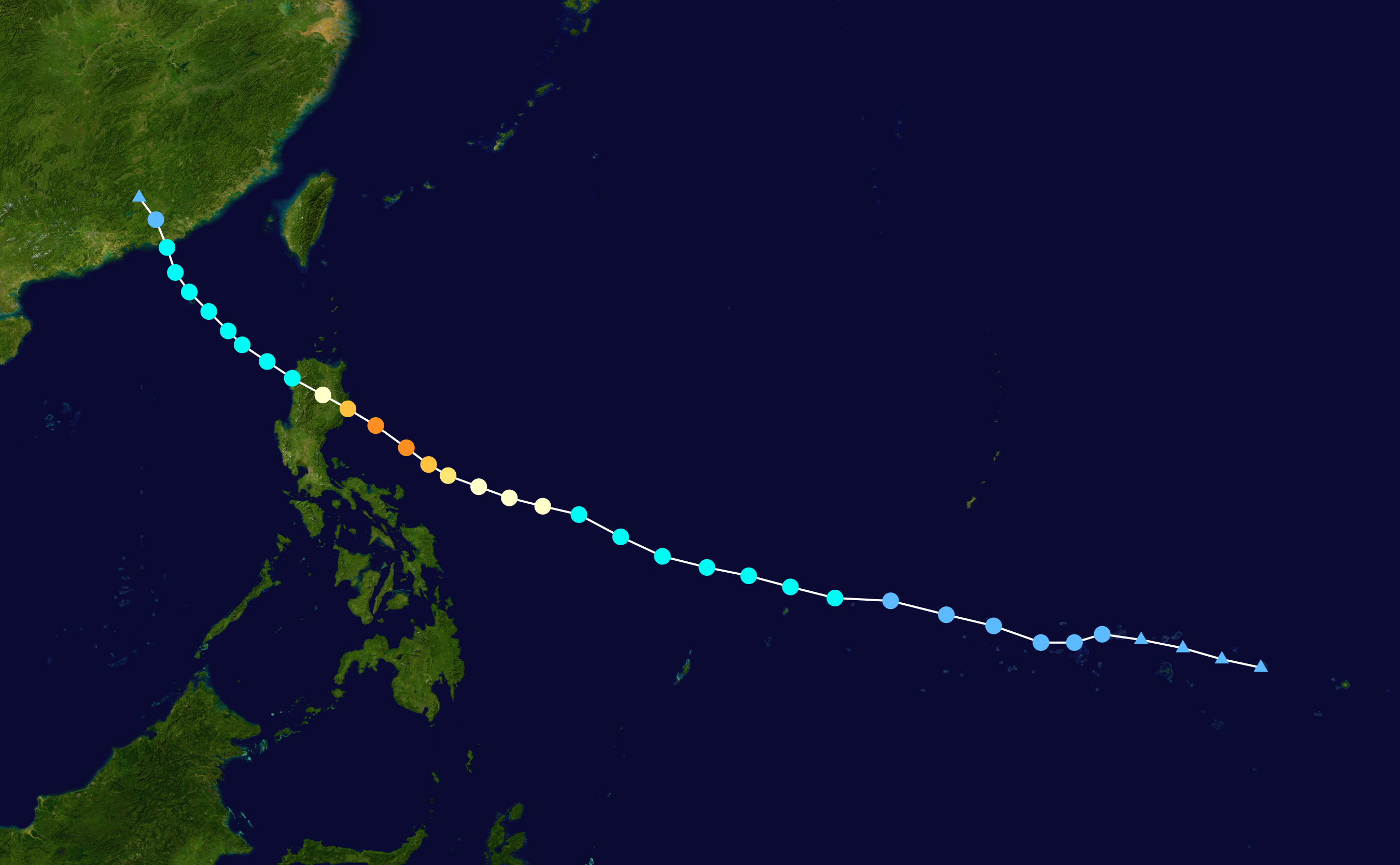
- Duration: July 17 – July 25
- Peak intensity: 185 km/h (115 mph) (10-min); 910 hPa (mbar)

An area of disturbed weather developed in association with the monsoon trough on July 19. Later that day, the JTWC issued a TCFA on the system as the disturbance was over warm water and low wind shear. Four hours later, the JMA classified the system as a tropical depression, with the JTWC following suit early the next day. Early the next day, both the JTWC and JMA upgraded the depression into a tropical storm, with the former agency naming it Kim. Further intensification was slow to occur as Kim tracked in the area where Typhoon Joe had previously trekked. However, on July 23, a hurricane hunter aircraft indicated falling pressures and the beginning of an eyewall. Based on this, both the JTWC and JMA announced that Kim obtained typhoon intensity. Around this time, Kim tracked into the PAR, causing PAGASA to name it Osang. Continuing to track west-northwest beneath a large subtropical ridge, Kim began to clear out an eye on the evening of July 23; subsequently, Kim entered a period of rapid deepening.

At July 24, the JTWC increased the intensity of Kim to 185 km/h (115 mph), while the JMA raised the winds to 170 km/h (105 mph). Ten hours later, a Hurricane hunter aircraft measured a pressure of 908 mbar (26.81 inHg), causing the JTWC to declare Kim a super typhoon and increasing the wind speed to 240 km/h (150 mph). At 18:00 on July 24, the JMA estimated that Kim reached its peak intensity to 170 km/h (105 mph). Almost immediately thereafter, reports from the same Hurricane Hunter aircraft indicated that the pressure of the typhoon rose sharply, likely in response to decreased inflow caused by Kim's close proximity to land. The JTWC estimated that Kim made landfall along the coast of Luzon with sustained winds of 185 km/h (115 mph), while the JMA reported that Kim moved ashore with winds of 145 km/h (90 mph). Continuing to weaken due to land interaction, Kim weakened into a tropical storm as it emerged into the South China Sea, On July 27, a weakening Kim crossed the coastline of China around 165 km (105 mi) northeast of Hong Kong. At the time of its second landfall, both the JTWC and JMA estimated winds of 80 km/h (50 mph). Twelve hours later, both the JTWC and JMA ceased tracking Kim.

Typhoon Kim caused widespread flooding across Luzon. In Manila, where floodwaters rose to more than 610 mm (24 in) in some suburbs, government offices and schools were closed. There, both Philippine Airlines and Philippine National Railways canceled all trips to the rest of the country. The coast guard suspended sailing permits to ships throughout the country. The Isabela province was the hardest hit by Typhoon Kim. Across the Philippines, 40 people were killed, 2 via drownings, and 19,000 others were affected. The HKO observed 136.3 mm (5.37 in) of rain over a 72-hour period. Within the vicinity of Hong Kong, minor damage was reported and there were no injuries. Power was knocked out in the urban city of Kowloon. Some villages were flooded and two landslides occurred.

=== Typhoon Lex ===
- Typhoon (JMA)
- Category 1 typhoon (SSHWS)
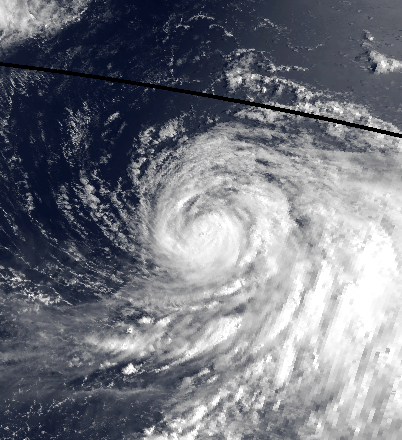
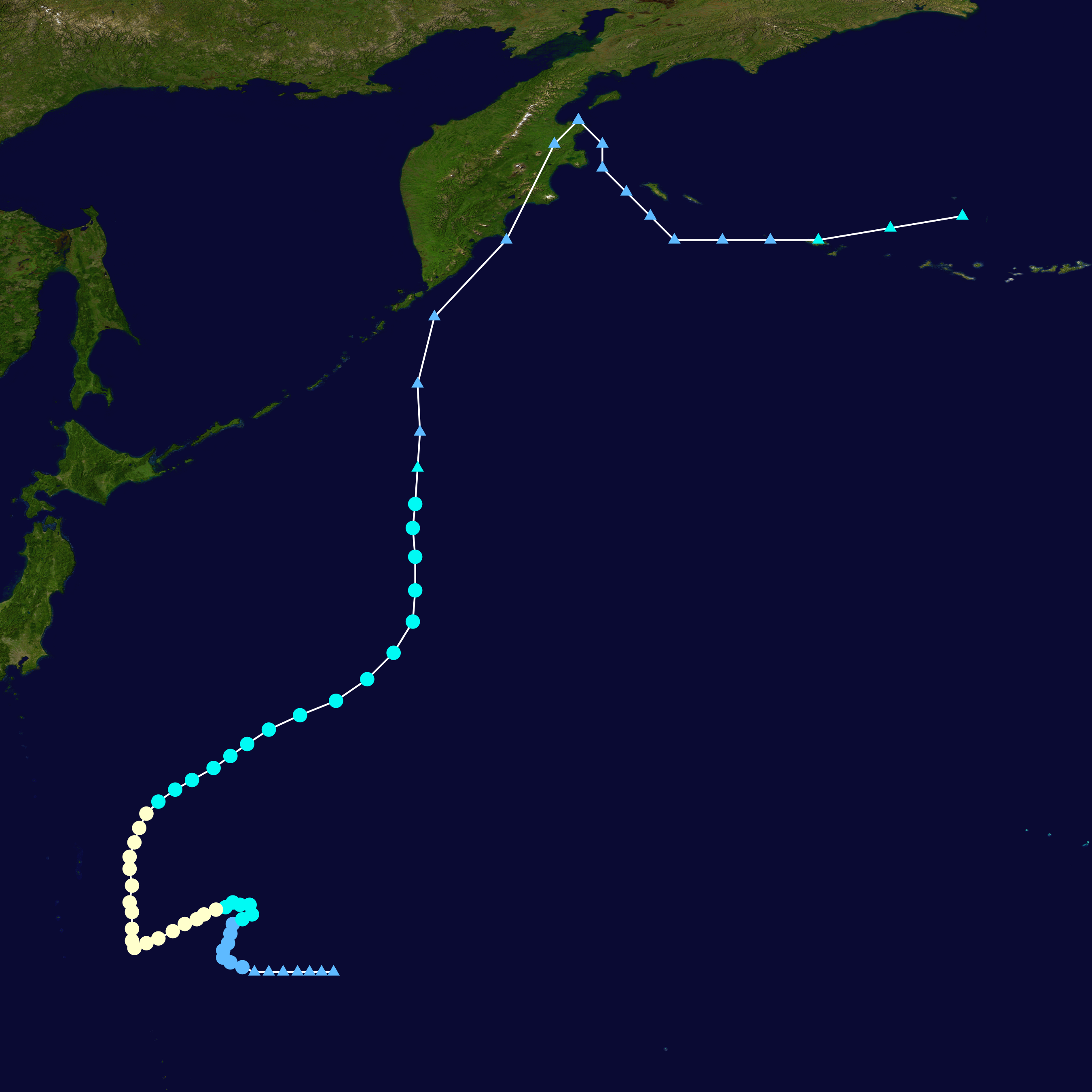
- Duration: July 28 – August 13
- Peak intensity: 140 km/h (85 mph) (10-min); 960 hPa (mbar)

On 24 July, a tropical disturbance which had recently spawned from a tropical upper tropospheric trough (TUTT) began developing. Steadily tracking westward, two days later, the JMA designated the system as a tropical depression. A few hours later, the JTWC issued a TCFA on the system as it steadily developed. As the depression's satellite signature improved, the JTWC issued their first warning on it early the next day. Twelve hours later, both the JTWC and JMA upgraded the system into a tropical storm, with the former agency naming it Lex. Tracking northwestward and steadily intensifying, on July 31, both agencies upgraded Lex into a typhoon. Soon after, Lex executed a cyclonic loop, later peaking with 1-minute sustained winds of 90 mph; 150 km/h (80 kn) and 10-minute sustained winds of 85 mph; 140 km/h (75 kn) according to the JMA. However, soon after, cold air from a deep surface low caused Lex to steadily weaken. As a result, on 7 August, Lex transitioned into an extratropical low according to the JTWC. The JMA kept monitoring Lex until 13 August.

=== Typhoon Marge ===
- Very strong typhoon (JMA)
- Category 3 typhoon (SSHWS)
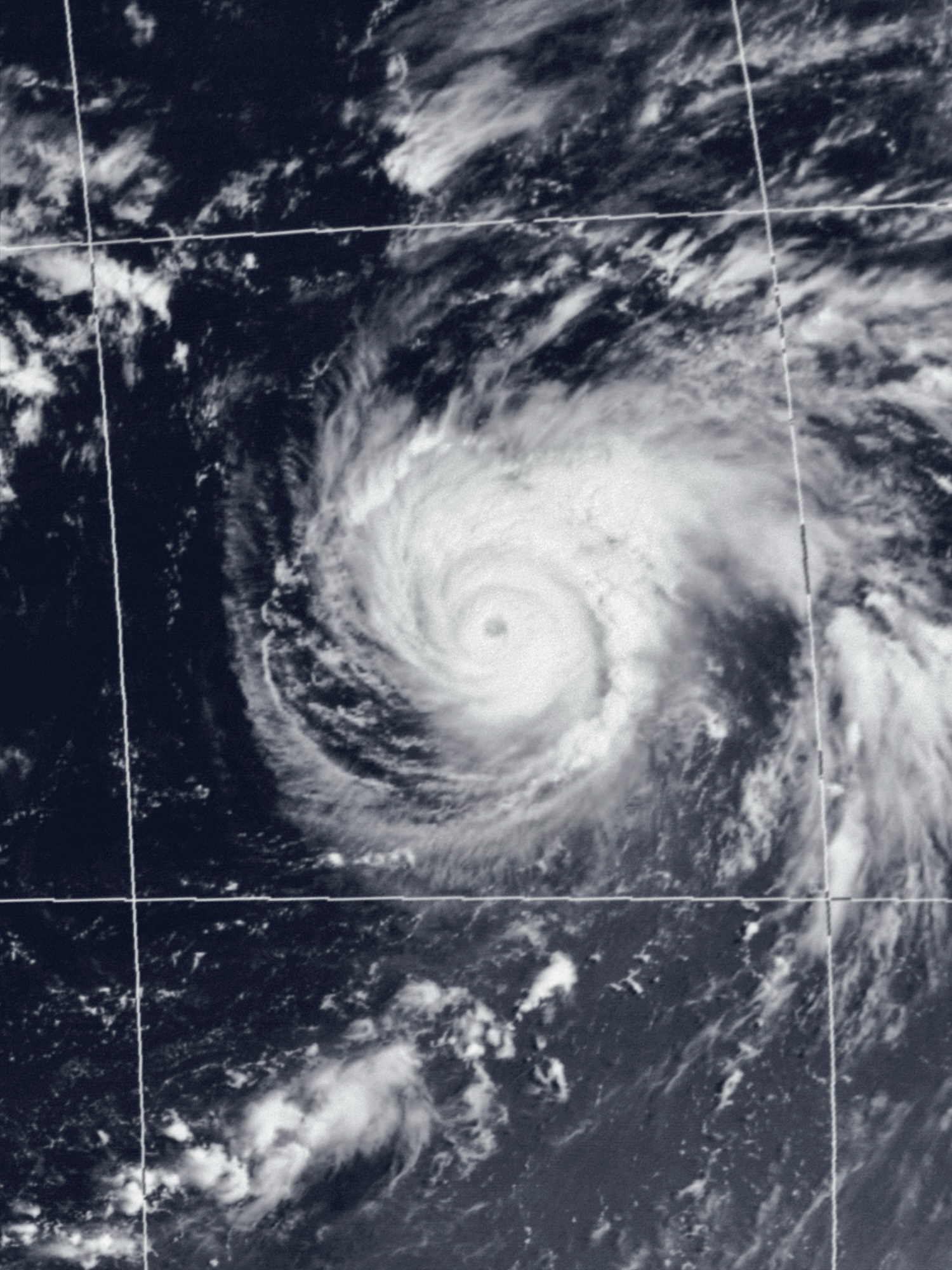
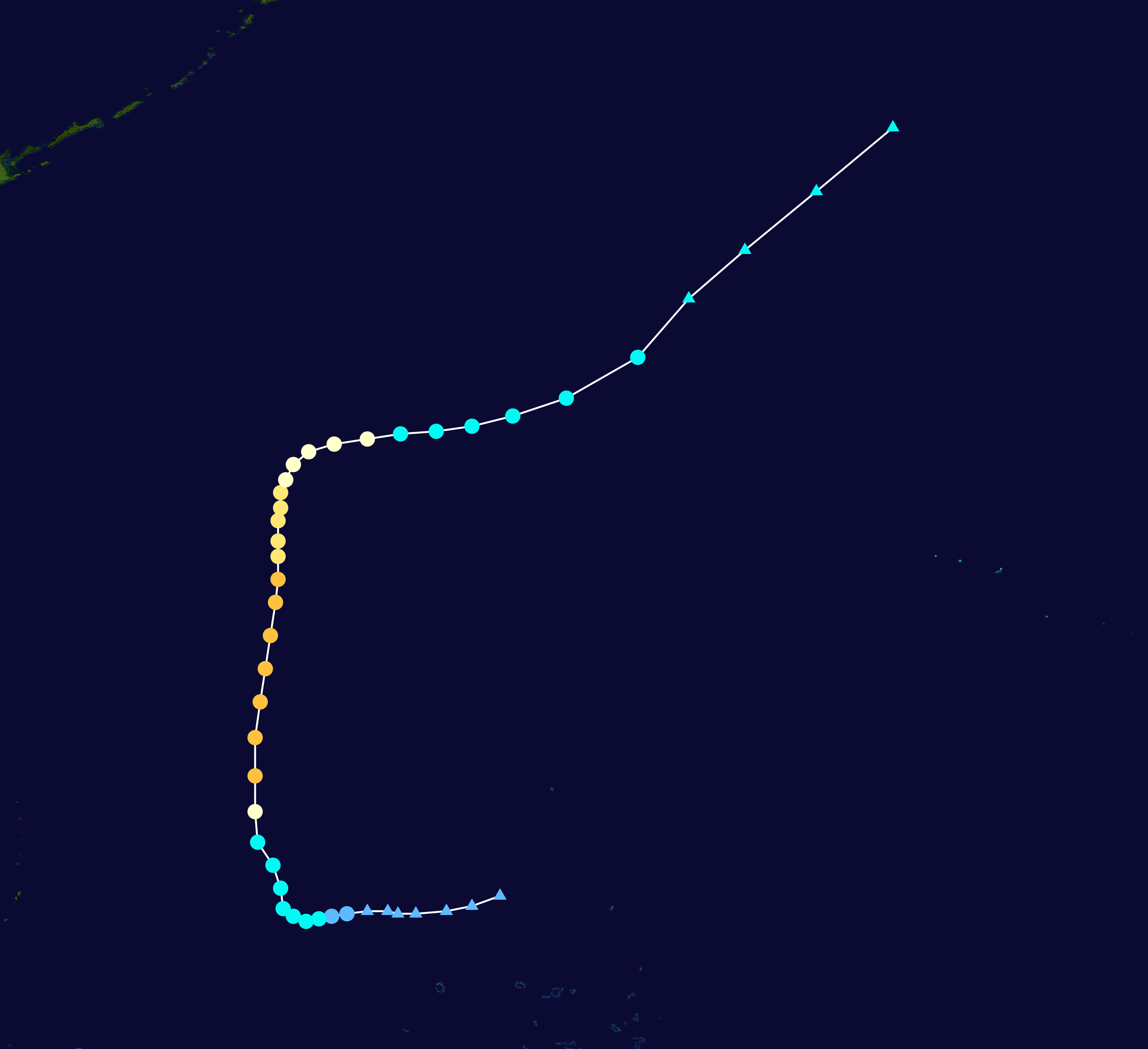
- Duration: August 8 – August 16
- Peak intensity: 165 km/h (105 mph) (10-min); 945 hPa (mbar)

On 6 August, due to atmospheric instability caused by a weakening Lex, an area of convection west of the Marshall Islands began developing. By the next day, the disturbance had expanded significantly, with convection being consolidated near its center of circulation. As a result on 8 August, both the JMA and JTWC designated Marge as a tropical storm, with the latter agency naming it Marge. Soon after, due to a col and a weakness inside a ridge, Marge began tracking northward. Steadily developing, on August 10, both the JTWC and JMA noted that Marge had intensified into a typhoon. The next day, Marge peaked with 1-minute sustained winds of 125 mph; 205 km/h (110 kn) and 10-minute sustained winds of 105 mph; 165 km/h (90 kn) according to the JMA. Slightly weakening, on 13 August, Marge encountered strong upper-level westerlies, causing it to rapidly weaken. As a result, the next day, Marge transitioned into an extratropical cyclone, causing the JTWC to stop tracking it. The JMA kept tracking it until the next day, when it merged with a mid-latitude cyclone.

=== Typhoon Norris (Reming) ===
- Very strong typhoon (JMA)
- Category 2 typhoon (SSHWS)
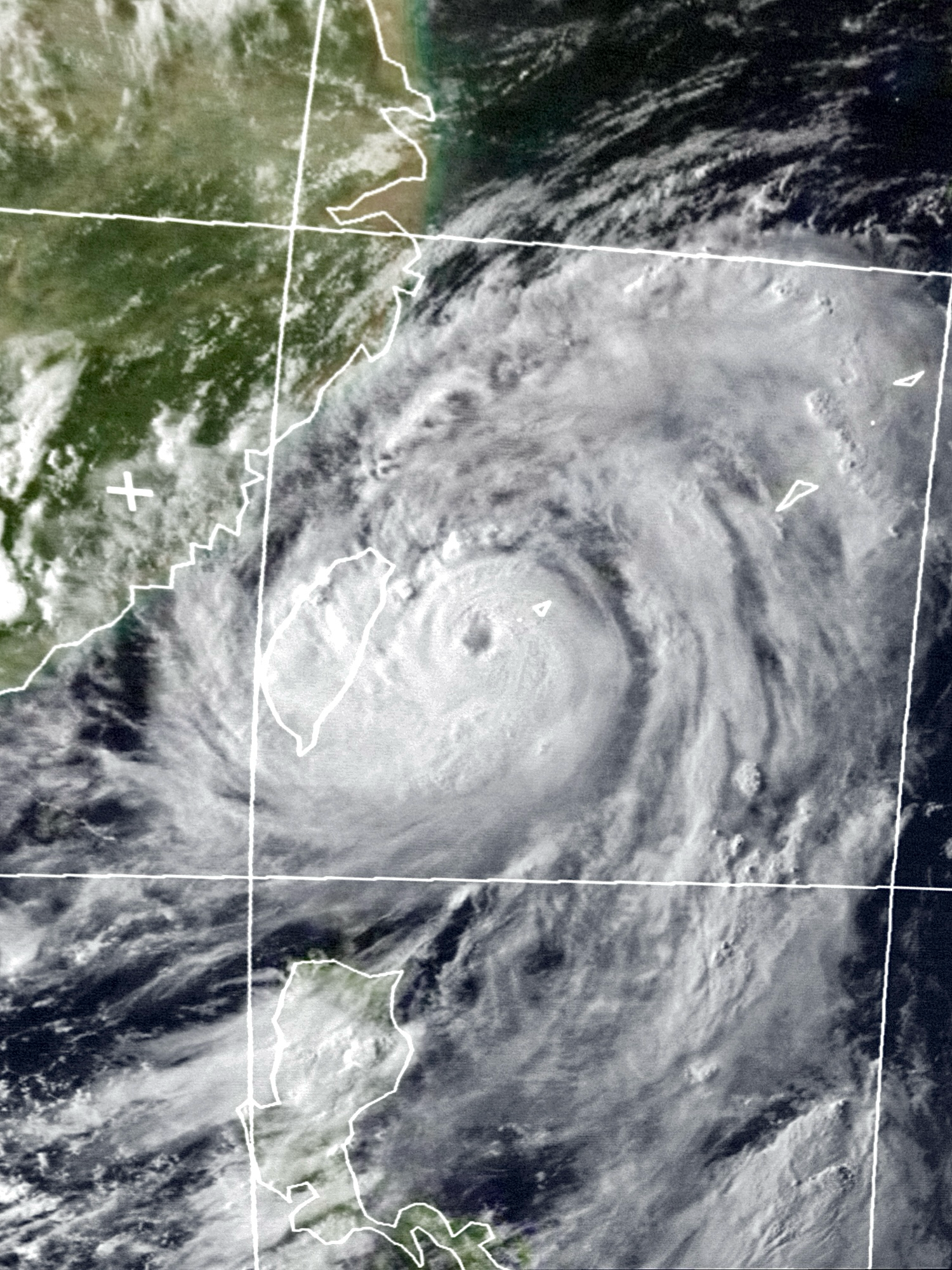
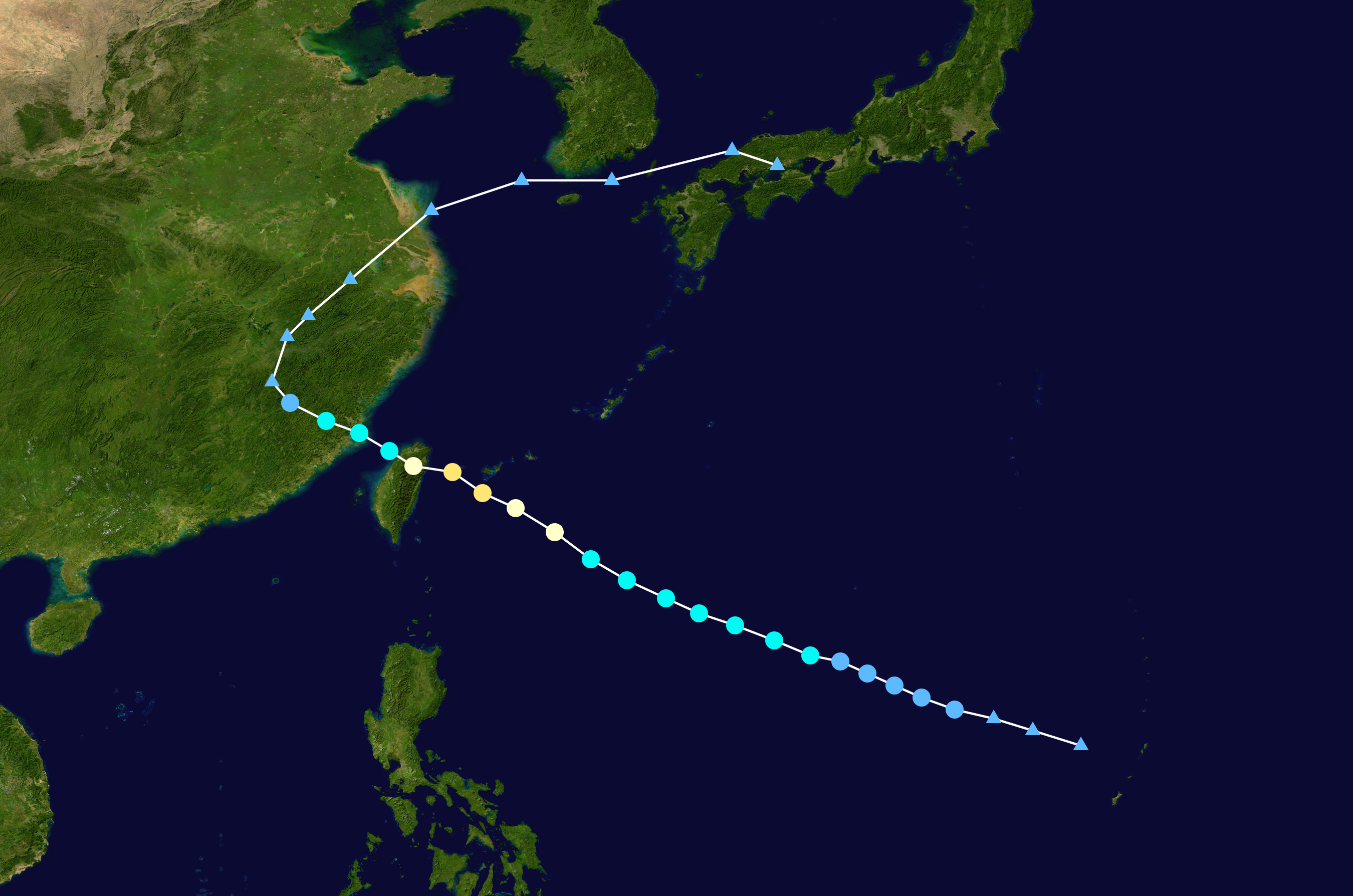
- Duration: August 23 – August 31
- Peak intensity: 175 km/h (110 mph) (10-min); 945 hPa (mbar)

On 15 August, a weak area of convection associated with a TUTT located over the Marshall Islands began slowly coalescing. Despite a nearby weak surface circulation initially hindering much development, on 23 August, the JTWC issued a TCFA on the system as the JMA designated the system as a tropical depression. Steadily tracking west-northwestwards, the next day, the JTWC followed suit with upgrading it into a depression, with PAGASA naming it Reming as it had crossed into the PAR. On 25 August, both the JMA and JTWC designated the system as a tropical storm, with the latter agency naming it Norris. After the surface circulation which had prevented Norris from strengthening dissipated early the next day, Norris intensified significantly, being recognized as a typhoon by both agencies the next day. A few hours later, Norris peaked with sustained winds of 90 kn (105 mph; 165 km/h) according to the JTWC and 95 kn (110 mph; 175 km/h) prior to making a landfall in Northern Taiwan. The mountainous ranges of Taiwan caused Norris to rapidly weaken, and by the time it made its second landfall south of Fuzhou on 28 August, both the JTWC and JMA had reported that it had weakened into a tropical storm. As a result, both PAGASA and the JTWC ceased tracking the system. The JMA kept monitoring it until 31 August.

As Norris passed just 10 nautical miles (12 miles; 19 km) southwest of Yonaguni on 27 August, winds of 90 kn (100 mph; 170 km/h) to the island. In Taiwan, gusts of 64 kn (74 mph; 119 km/h) were recorded. Flooding caused by the typhoon swept away 60 houses in Northern Taiwan, causing two deaths. Additionally, Norris caused four fishing vessels off the eastern coast of the island to capsize. Despite that, Norris primarily brought heavy rainfall, which eased Taiwan's worst drought since 1950.

=== Typhoon Orchid (Toyang) ===
- Typhoon (JMA)
- Category 2 typhoon (SSHWS)
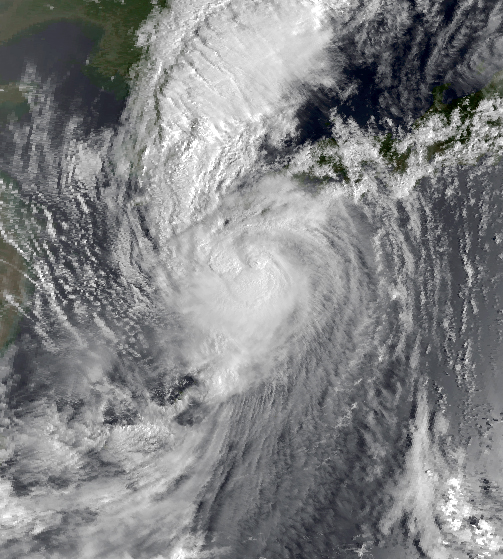
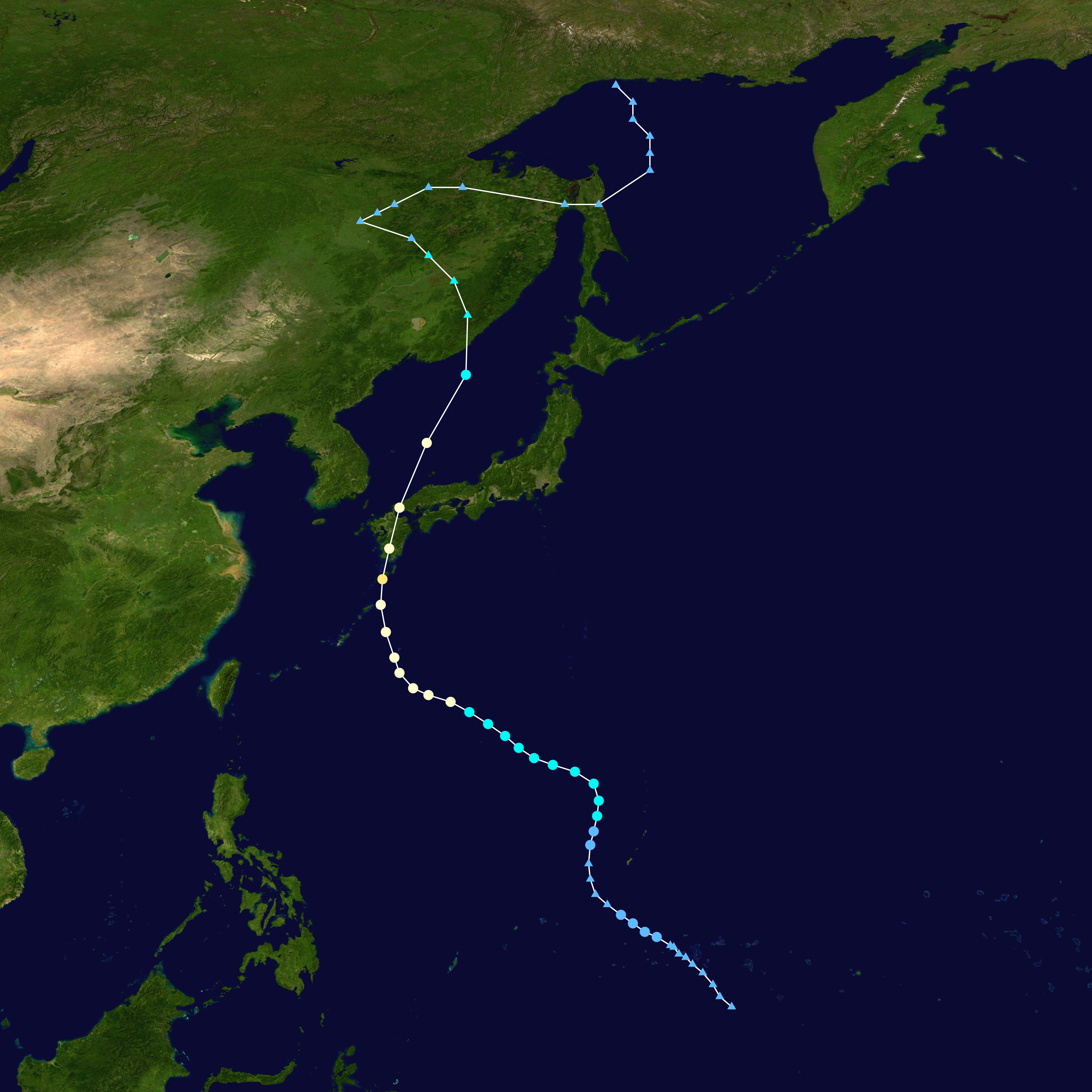
- Duration: September 4 – September 16
- Peak intensity: 130 km/h (80 mph) (10-min); 960 hPa (mbar)

On 4 September, the JMA designated a tropical disturbance as a tropical depression. Two days later, the JTWC began tracking it, issuing a TCFA on the developing system. The next day, both the JMA and JTWC designated the system as a tropical storm, with the latter agency naming it Orchid. Tracking west-northwest, as it crossed into the subtropical latitudes on 9 September, both the JMA and JTWc noted that Orchid had intensified into a typhoon. Meanwhile, PAGASA temporarily tracked the system as it was in the PAR, naming it Toyang before the system left their area of responsibility the next day. As Orchid executed three cyclonic loops from 9–10 September, the JMA noted that Orchid had peaked with 10-minute sustained winds of 70 kn (80 mph; 130 km/h) while the JTWC noted that Orchid had peaked with 1-minute sustained winds of 85 kn (100 mph; 155 km/h). The next day, Orchid made landfall in Japan, slightly weakening due to colder waters. As a result, the JTWC stopped tracking the system. The JMA kept tracking the system until it dissipated on 16 September.

As the depression initially coalesced, the JTWC issued a gale warning for Guam. The ninth tropical cyclone to strike Japan during the season, Orchid killed six people in Kyushu and triggered devastating landslides on the country's main island of Honshu, causing crops to sustain heavy damage. More than 15,000 people were affected due to the devastating landslides and wind gusts. The MV Derbyshire, a ship which was headed for Kawasaki with iron ore from Sept-Îles, Canada on July 11, was sunk by Orchid. All 44 people on board died. In South Korea, Orchid caused at least three deaths, leaving over a hundred fishermen missing.

=== Severe Tropical Storm Ruth ===
- Severe tropical storm (JMA)
- Category 1 typhoon (SSHWS)
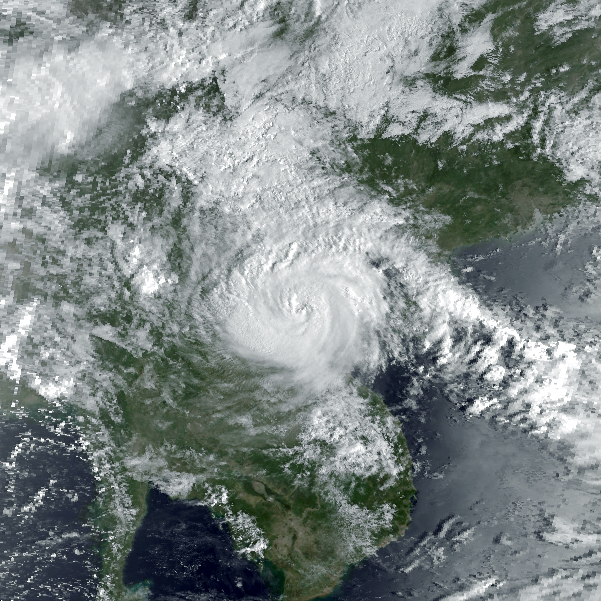
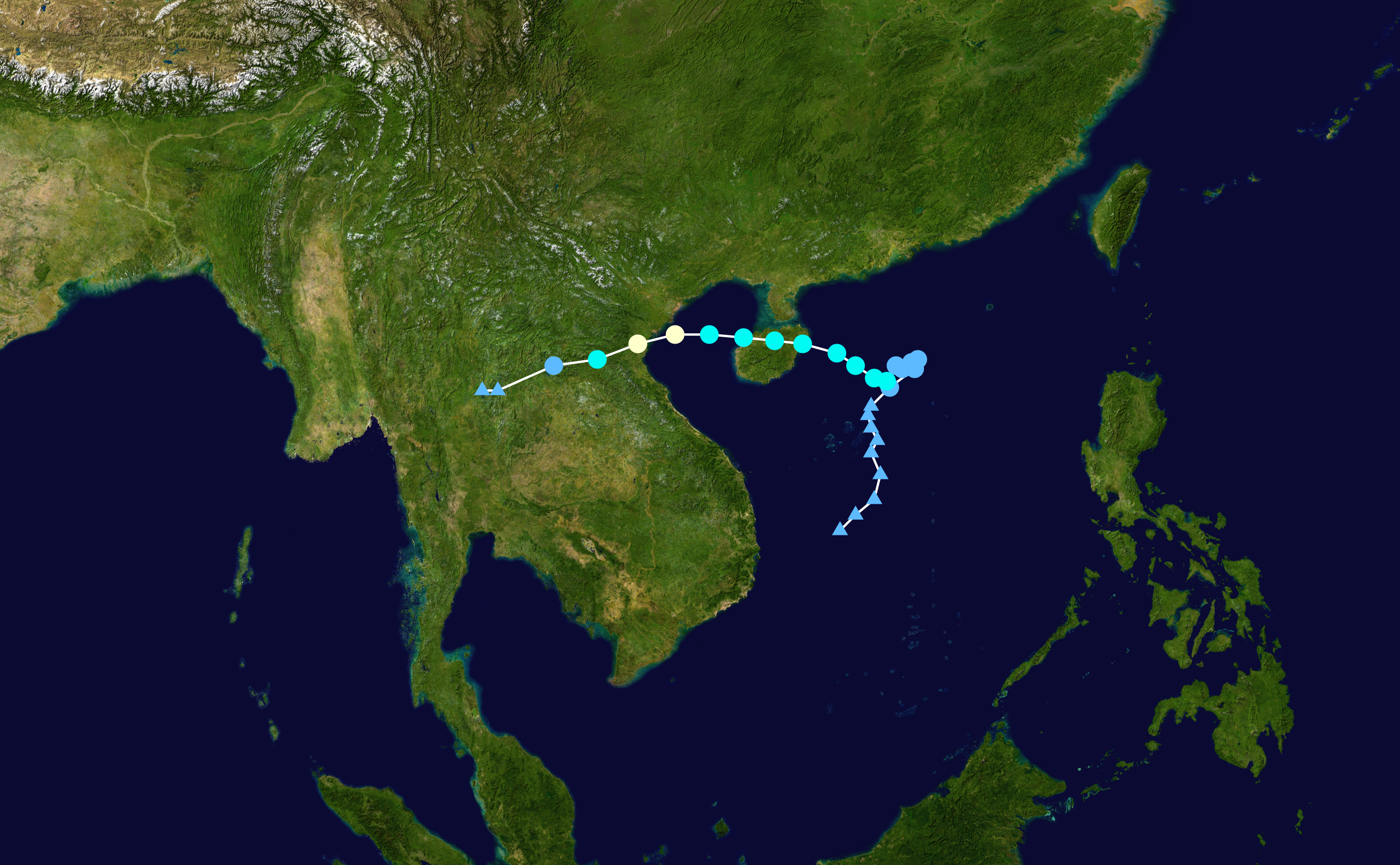
- Duration: September 12 – September 17
- Peak intensity: 100 km/h (65 mph) (10-min); 980 hPa (mbar)

On 11 September, a monsoon depression in the South China Sea which was embedded in the monsoon trough started developing. As it tracked quasi-stationary for the next two days, early on 12 September, the JMA designated the system as a tropical depression. Soon after, sypnotic data revealed that the system's circulation was developing, causing the JTWC to follow suit in upgrading it into a depression early the next day. Later that day, the JTWC noted that the tropical depression had intensified into a tropical storm, naming it Ruth. The JMA later followed suit early the next day. Tracking northwestward, a few hours later, Ruth made landfall in Hainan Island with 1-minute sustained winds of 45 kn (50 mph; 85 km/h). Weakening, as it entered the Gulf of Tonkin early on 15 September, it became a minimal tropical storm.

The warm waters of the Gulf of Tonkin, which were 29 °C (84 °F) as the weak cyclone tracked into there, enabled Ruth to significantly intensify. As a result, according to the JTWC, Ruth underwent rapid intensification, peaking as a minimal typhoon with 1-minute sustained winds of 65 kn (75 mph; 120 km/h). The JMA, however, stated that Ruth peaked with 10-minute sustained winds of 55 kn (65 mph; 100 km/h) at that time. Just a few hours later, early on 16 September, Ruth made landfall south of Thanh Hóa, Vietnam. The lowest air pressure value recorded in Quỳnh Lưu (Nghệ Tĩnh) during the period when the storm had an impact was 984.3 hPa (29.07 inHg). Rapidly weakening, a few hours later, the JTWC stopped tracking Ruth, claiming it had dissipated. The JMA kept tracking a weakening Ruth until September 17, with the remnants dissipating in Bilauktaung Range the next day.

In Vietnam, nearly half a million people were left homeless, with 173 dead and 6 missing. The worst typhoon to strike Thanh Hoa province in 30 years, a 2022 report from GeoHazards stated that from 1970 to 2018, Ruth was the tropical cyclone which caused the most crop damage in the area.

=== Typhoon Percy (Undang) ===
- Very strong typhoon (JMA)
- Category 4 typhoon (SSHWS)
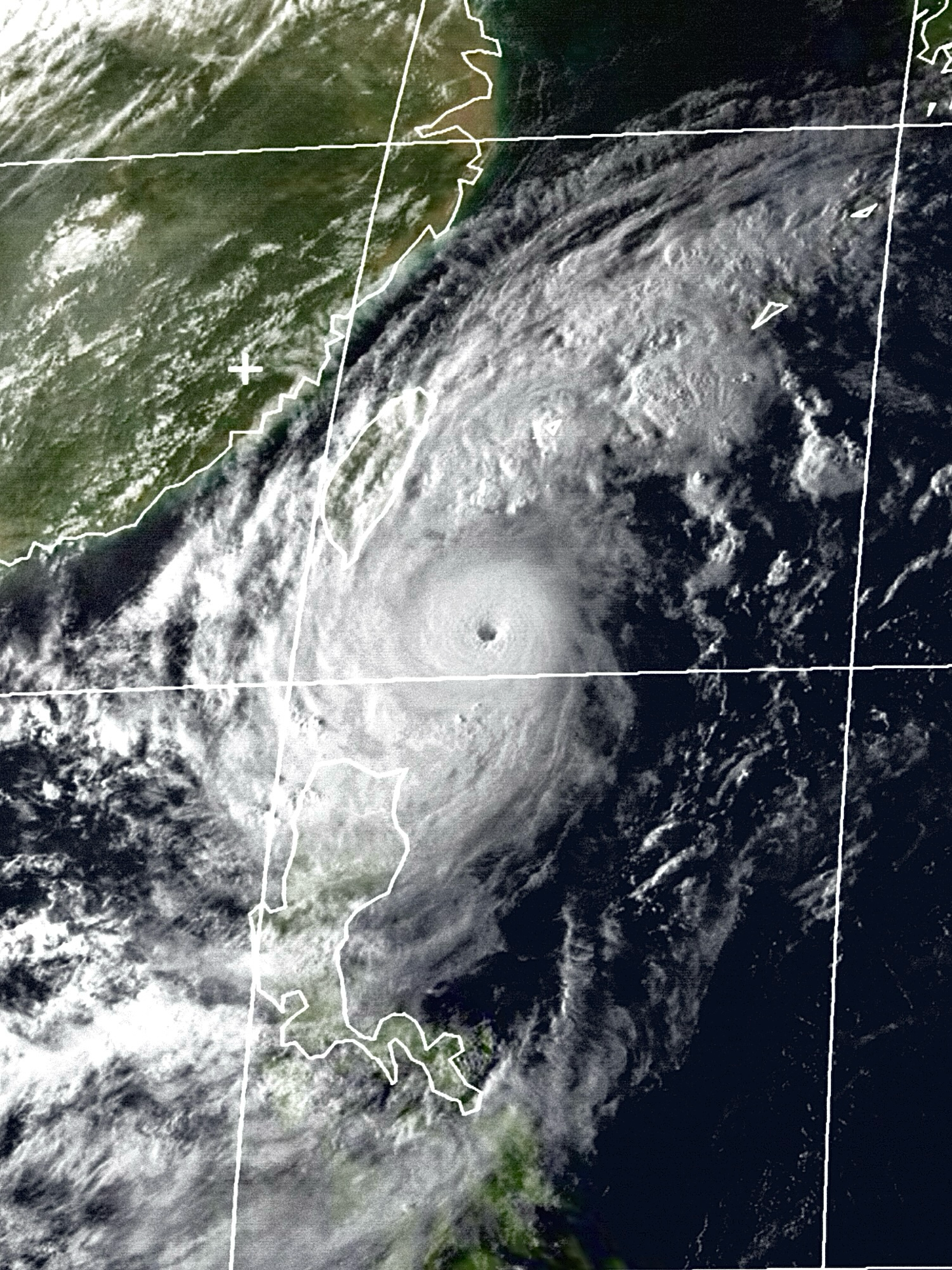
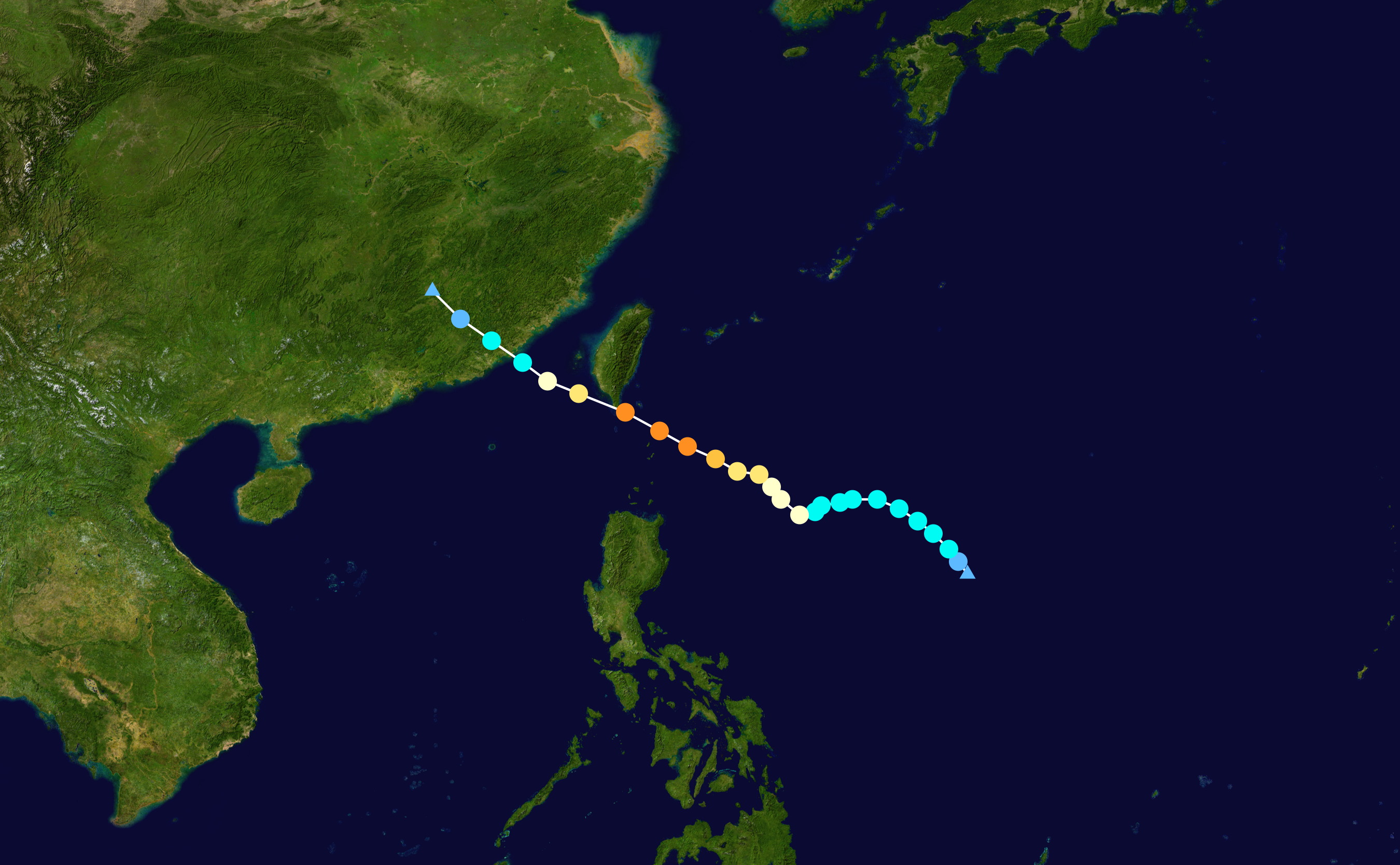
- Duration: September 13 – September 19
- Peak intensity: 185 km/h (115 mph) (10-min); 915 hPa (mbar)

On 13 September, a tropical disturbance located at the base of a mid-tropospheric trough extending south of Japan began developing. Around the time that the JTWC was tracking it, the JMA designated the system as a tropical depression. The next day, both the JMA and JTWC recognized the system as a tropical storm, causing the JTWC to name it Percy. Additionally, Percy crossed into the PAR, causing PAGASA to name it Undang. Soon after, Perry executed two cyclonic loops, being upgraded into a typhoon by both the JTWC and JMA on 16 September. The next day, an aircraft fix revealed that according to the JTWC, Percy had peaked with 1-minute sustained winds of 125 kn (145 mph; 230 km/h). A few hours later, the JMA noted that Percy had peaked with 10-minute sustained winds of 100 kn (115 mph; 185 km/h).

Steadily weakening soon after, around 01:00 UTC the next day, Percy made landfall on the southern tip of Taiwan. Despite crossing the Formosa Strait just a few hours later, the mountainous climate of Taiwan had caused Percy's inflow to be disrupted, preventing any strengthening and causing Percy to weaken as fast as it had strengthened. Early the next day, Percy left the PAR, causing PAGASA to cease tracking it. A few hours later, Percy made landfall east of Guangzhou as a minimal tropical storm. Rapidly weakening once inland, on 19 September, both the JTWC and JMA had ceased tracking it, with the former agency noting that Percy had dissipated at that time.

As Percy scraped Taiwan, heavy rainfall damaged around 140 homes, destroyed crops, and flooded rice fields. Due to the typhoon, 7 people died with 16 being injured.

=== Typhoon Sperry ===
- Typhoon (JMA)
- Category 1 typhoon (SSHWS)
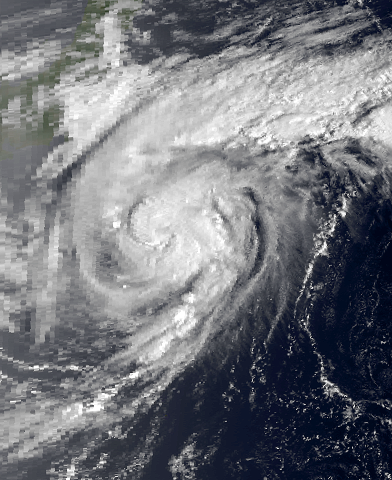
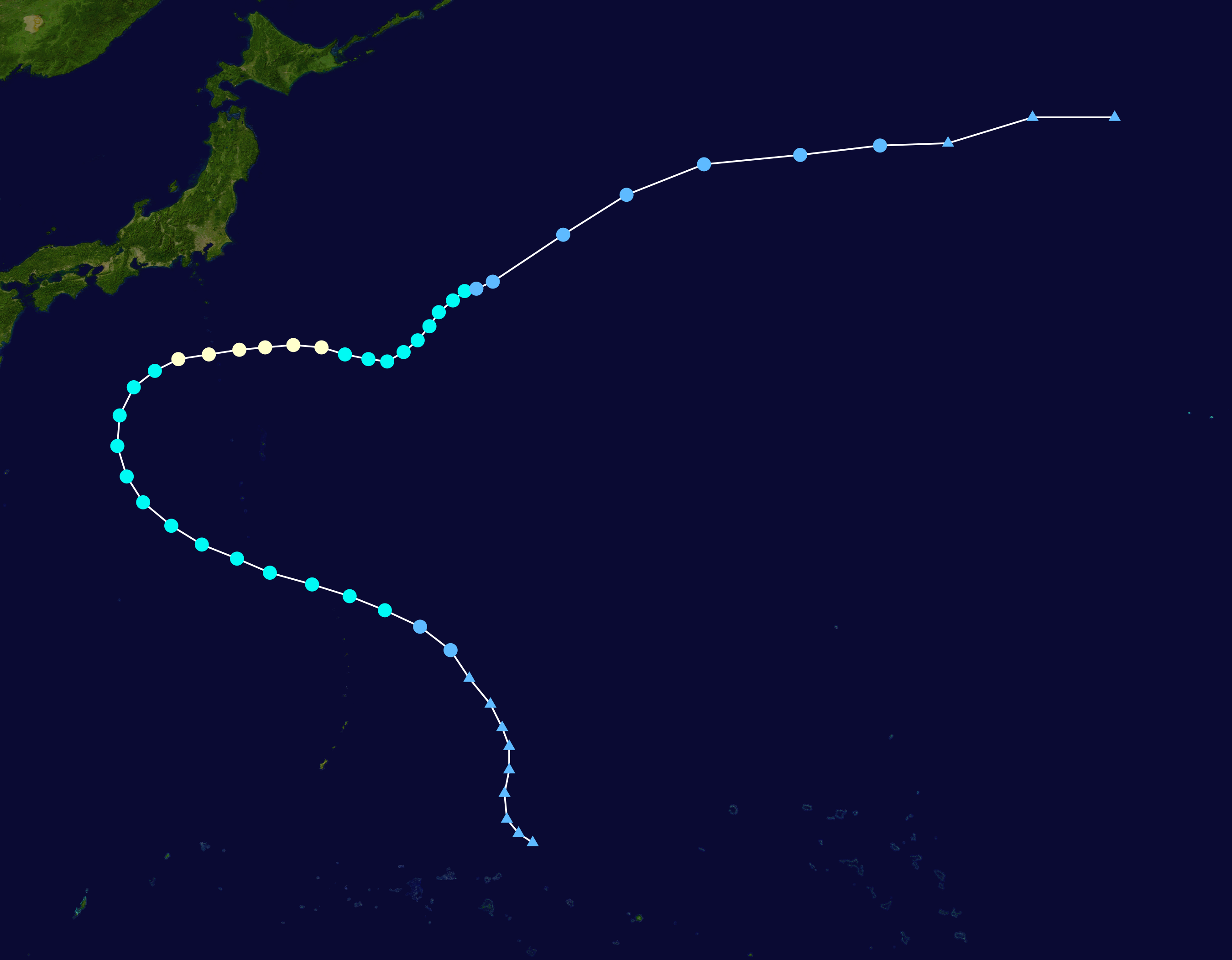
- Duration: September 14 – September 24
- Peak intensity: 120 km/h (75 mph) (10-min); 975 hPa (mbar)

On 12 September, a weak area of clouds and thunderstorms began developing in the monsoon trough. Despite not having a surface circulation, the upper-air pattern was conducive for the disturbance's development, and on 14 September, it had developed a surface circulation. As a result of that, the JMA designated the system as a tropical depression later that day around the time that the JTWC issued a TCFA on the nascent system. Early the next day, Sperry intensified into a tropical storm. Despite that, initially, the JTWC claimed that it had developed into a tropical depression. Tracking northeastward due to mid-level southeasterly flow near Japan, Sperry began recurving south of Japan on 17 September. As it recurved, early the next day, the JTWC noted that Sperry had intensified and peaked as a typhoon. The JMA, however, stated that Sperry was actually a severe tropical storm at the time, noting that Sperry had really peaked as a minimal typhoon early on 19 September.

Despite its eastward track preventing it from initially encountering colder waters and intense wind shear, Sperry began weakening around the time that it peaked. As a result, by the next day, both agencies stated that Sperry had weakened into a tropical storm. Later that day, the JTWC stopped tracking Sperry as according to them, it had become an extratropical cyclone. The JMA kept tracking a weakening Sperry until it dissipated near the International Date Line on 24 September.

=== Severe Tropical Storm Thelma ===
- Severe tropical storm (JMA)
- Tropical storm (SSHWS)
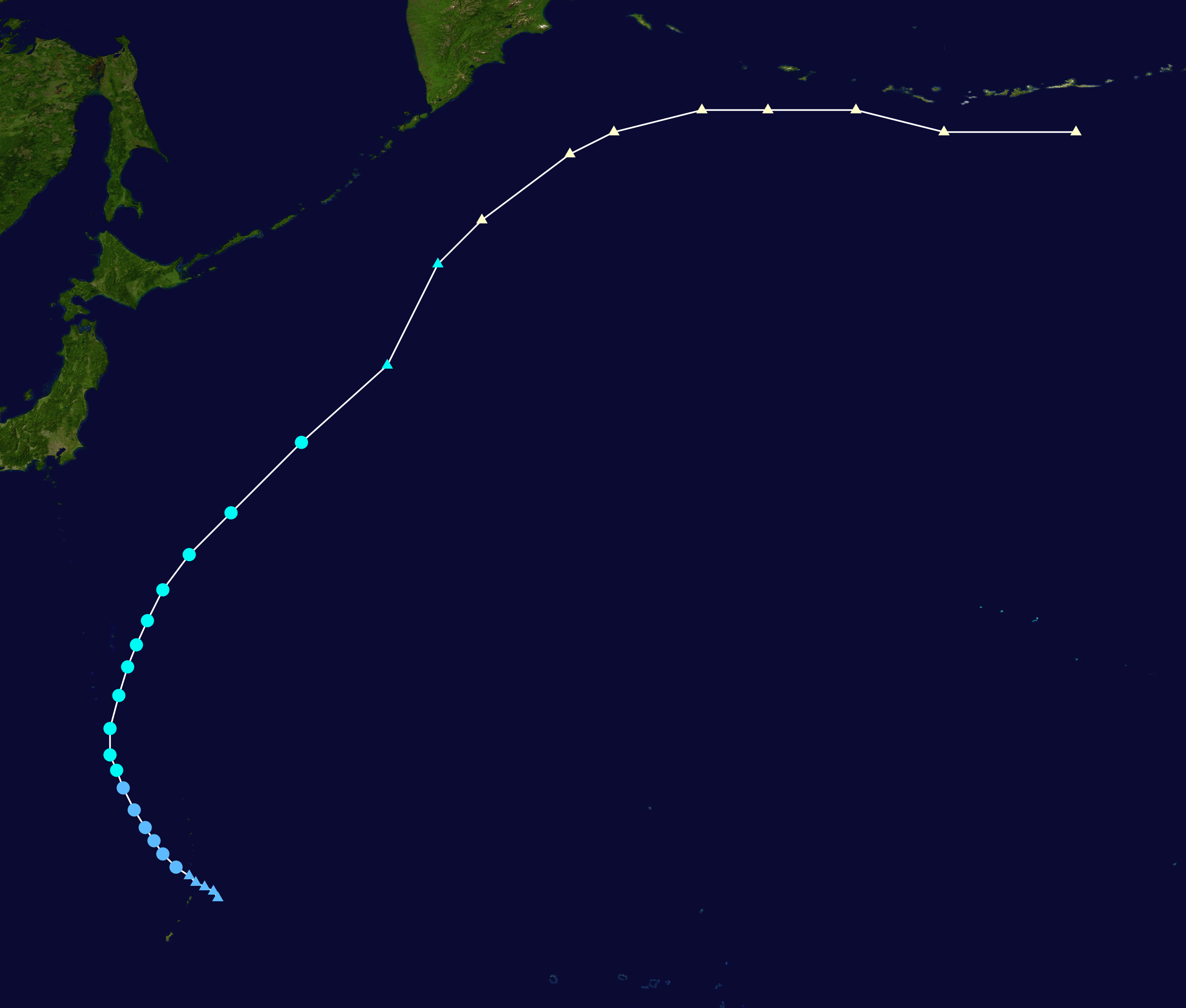
- Duration: September 25 – October 2
- Peak intensity: 100 km/h (65 mph) (10-min); 960 hPa (mbar)

On 23 September, satellite imagery shown that an area of increased convective activity was developing in the area from Southeast Asia to the Marshall Islands. Later that day, a significant area of convection formed near Saipan, with a surface circulation just south of Guam developing from it the next day. On 25 September, the JMA designated this circulation as a tropical depression, with the JTWC following suit early the next day. Initially slow to develop, on 27 September, both the JMA and JTWC designated it as a tropical storm, with the latter agency naming it Thelma. Tracking northwestward, by 29 September, a surface trough caused Thelma to track northeastward instead. It was at that time when both the JMA and JTWC noted that Thelma had peaked with sustained winds of 65 mph (100 km/h). However, due to a restriction in Thelma's upper-level outflow alongside the storm tracking into the baroclinic zone, Thelma soon began transitioning into an extratropical low. As a result, the JTWC stopped tracking Thelma the next day as it became extratropical. The JMA kept tracking Thelma, noting that it had deepened to attain a minimal central pressure of 960 mbar (28 inHg) on 2 October. However, they stopped tracking it later that day after it passed 50° N.

=== Typhoon Vernon ===
- Very strong typhoon (JMA)
- Category 3 typhoon (SSHWS)
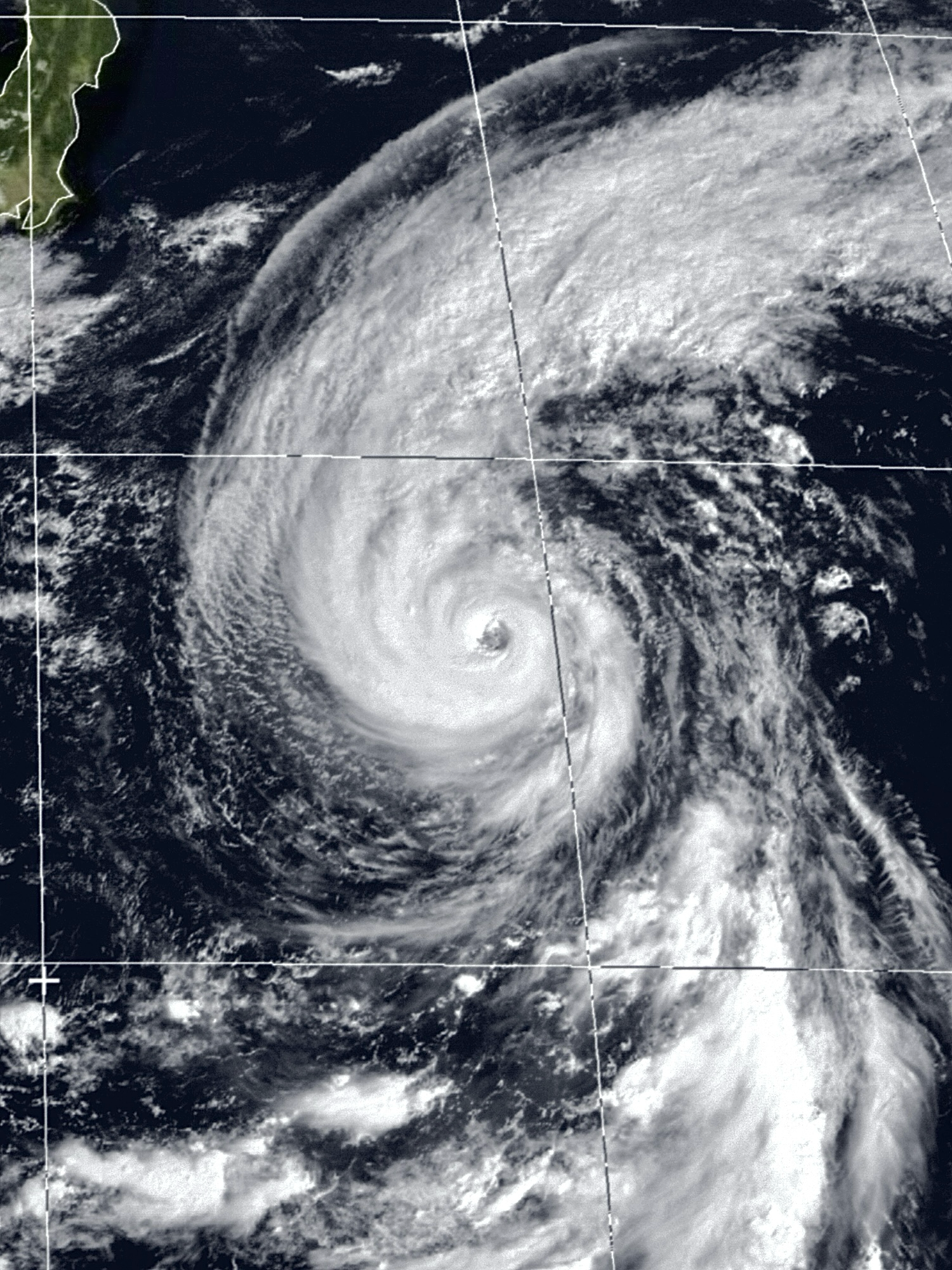
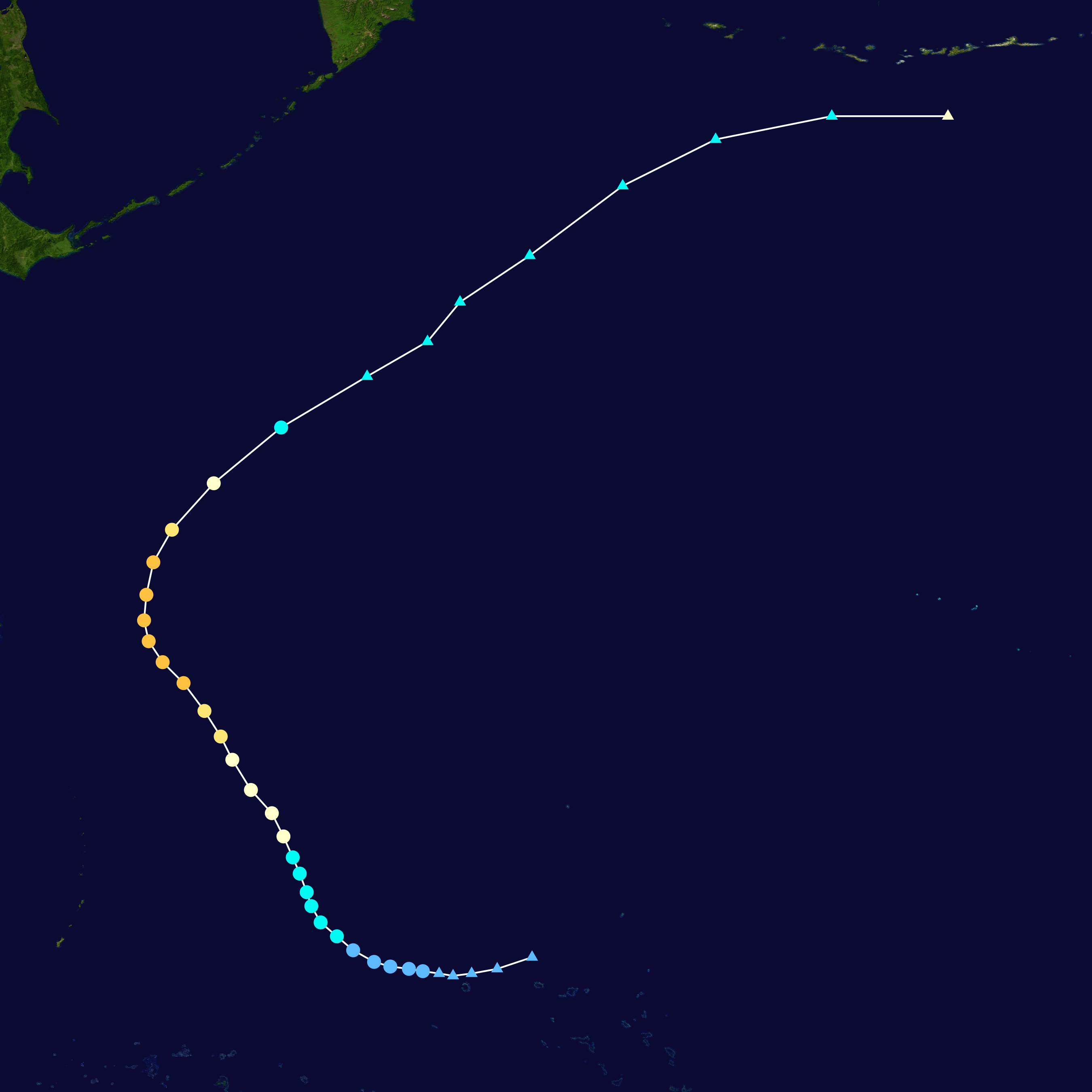
- Duration: September 27 – October 3
- Peak intensity: 175 km/h (110 mph) (10-min); 935 hPa (mbar)

A cluster of thunderstorms formed 370 km (230 mi) northeast of Eniwetok Atoll on September 26, being named Vernon the following day. As Vernon tracked northwestward, it interacted with Thelma to the north. Thelma covered a large area which restricted the upper-level outflow to Vernon. Once Thelma moved off to the northeast on October 1, an outflow channel to Vernon's north and northwest allowed it to intensity into a Category 3-equivalent typhoon. Vernon rapidly transitioned to an extratropical cyclone and lost its heavy convection on the 3rd.

=== Typhoon Wynne (Welpring) ===
- Violent typhoon (JMA)
- Category 5 super typhoon (SSHWS)
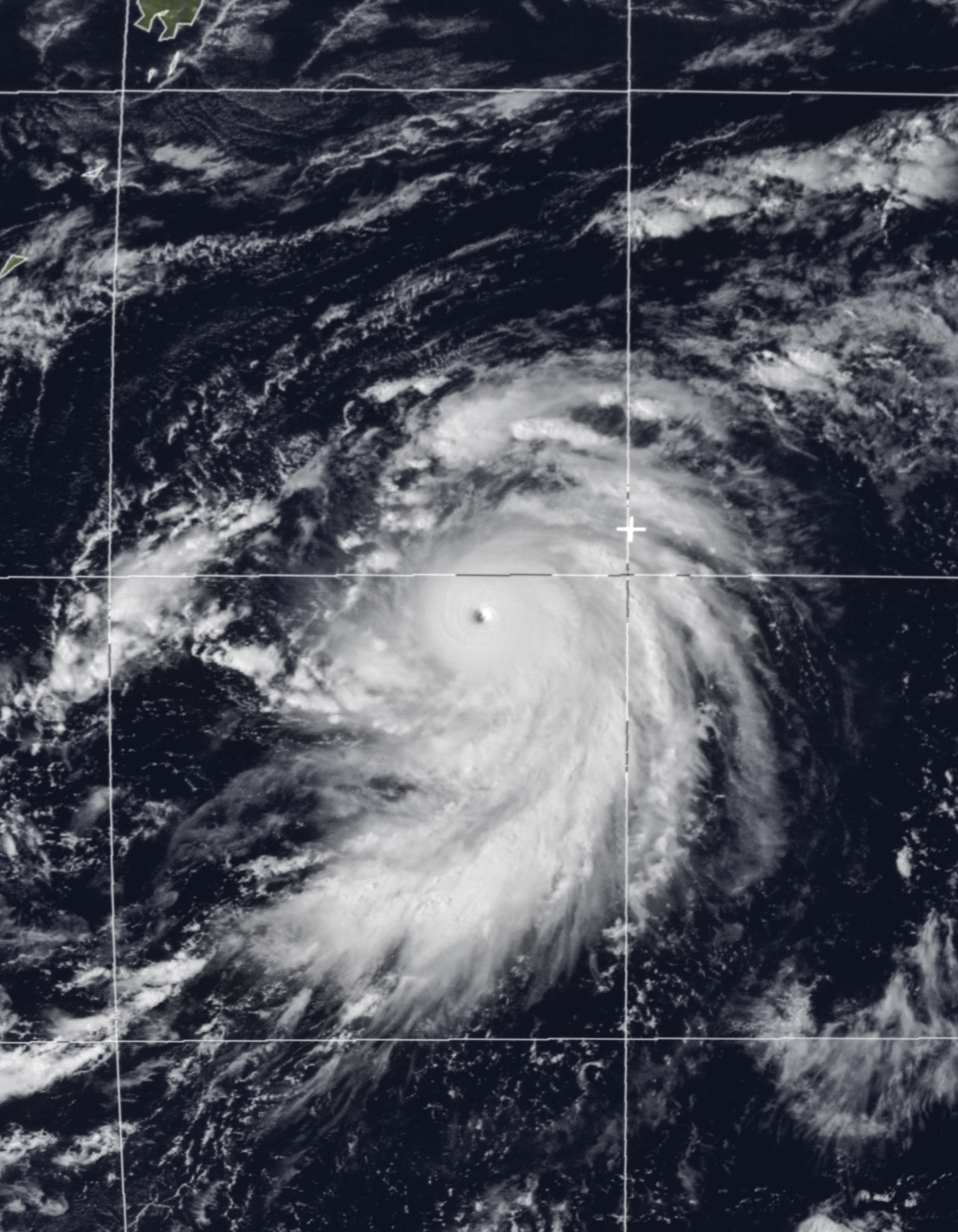
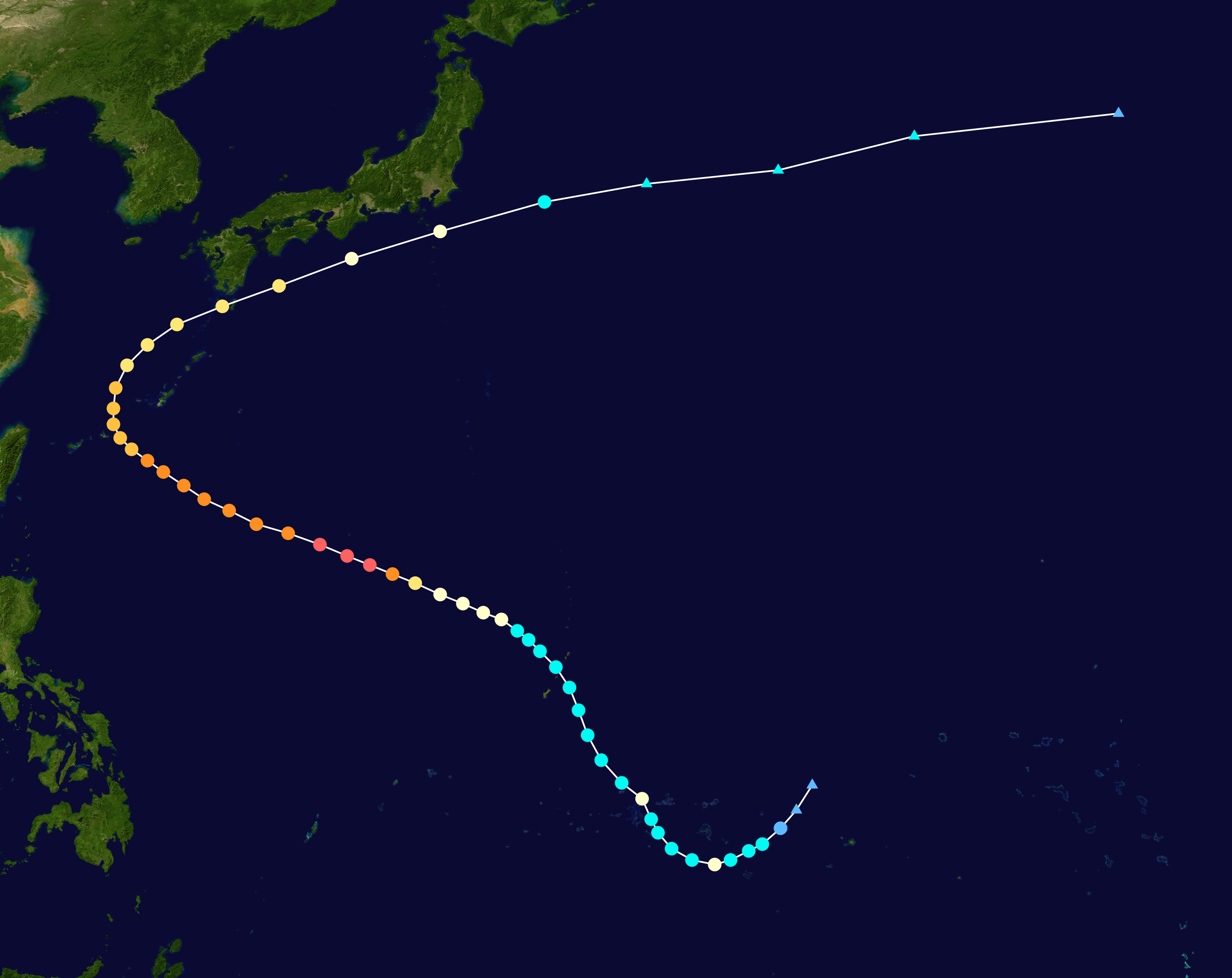
- Duration: October 3 – October 14
- Peak intensity: 220 km/h (140 mph) (10-min); 890 hPa (mbar)

Wynne was the strongest storm of the season, reaching a peak of 175 mph (282 km/h) winds and a pressure of 890 mbar. As a strengthening category 1 storm, it rapidly intensified to become the strongest storm of the season, deepening 85 mb from 975 mb to 890 mb in 23 hours 56 minutes between 0240 UTC October 8 and 0236 UTC October 9, 1980. It caused 6 power outages in Japan, and 10 deaths.

=== Tropical Storm Alex ===
- Tropical storm (JMA)
- Tropical storm (SSHWS)
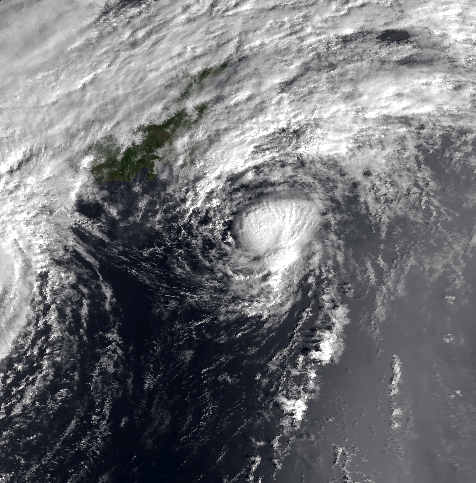
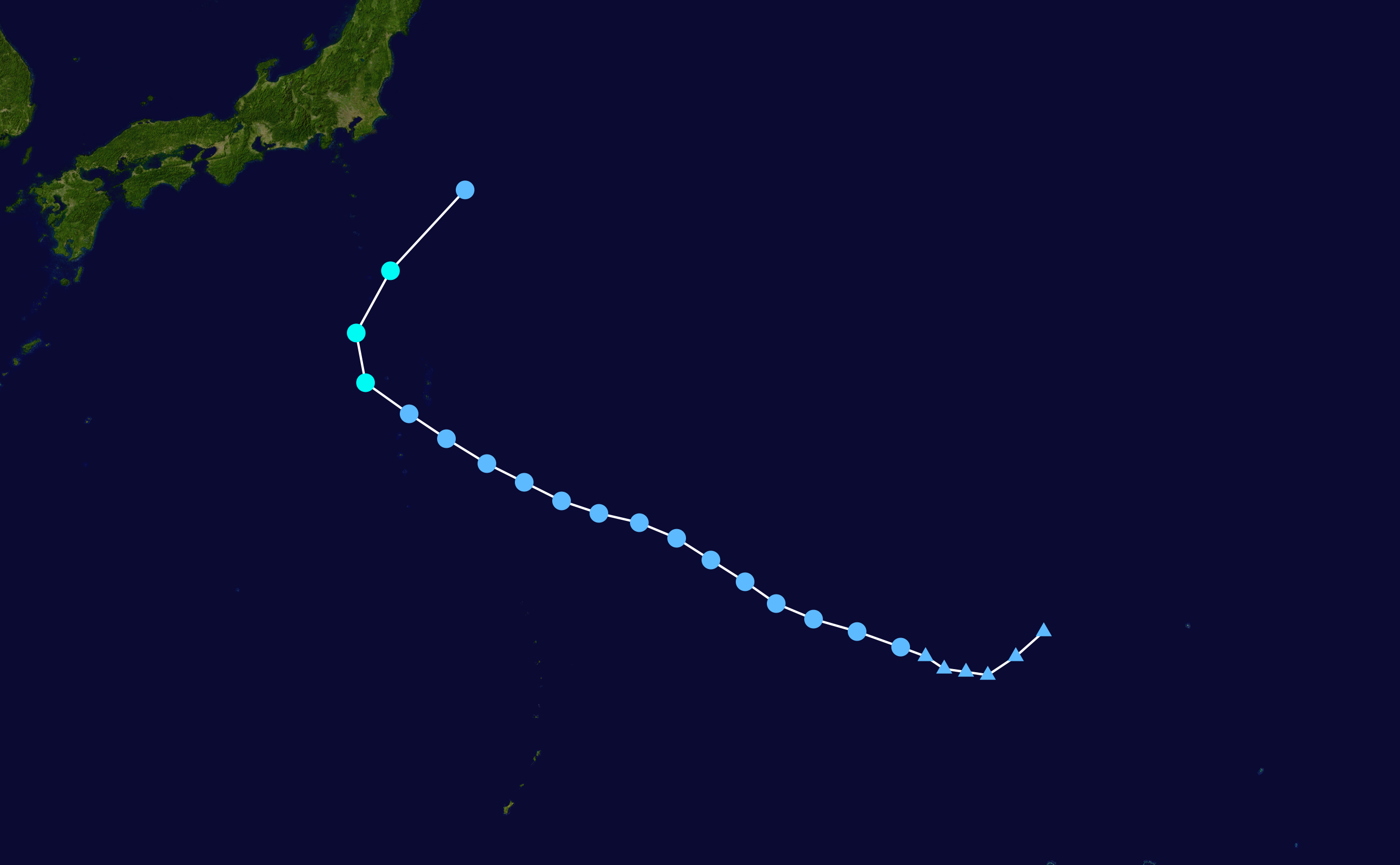
- Duration: October 9 – October 14
- Peak intensity: 65 km/h (40 mph) (10-min); 998 hPa (mbar)

A tropical disturbance formed over the open seas on October 9. The disturbance struggled to develop for a few days before intensifying gradually and getting named Alex on the 12th. Alex stayed over water before interacting and being absorbed by Wynne along the jet stream.

=== Typhoon Betty (Aring) ===
- Very strong typhoon (JMA)
- Category 4 typhoon (SSHWS)
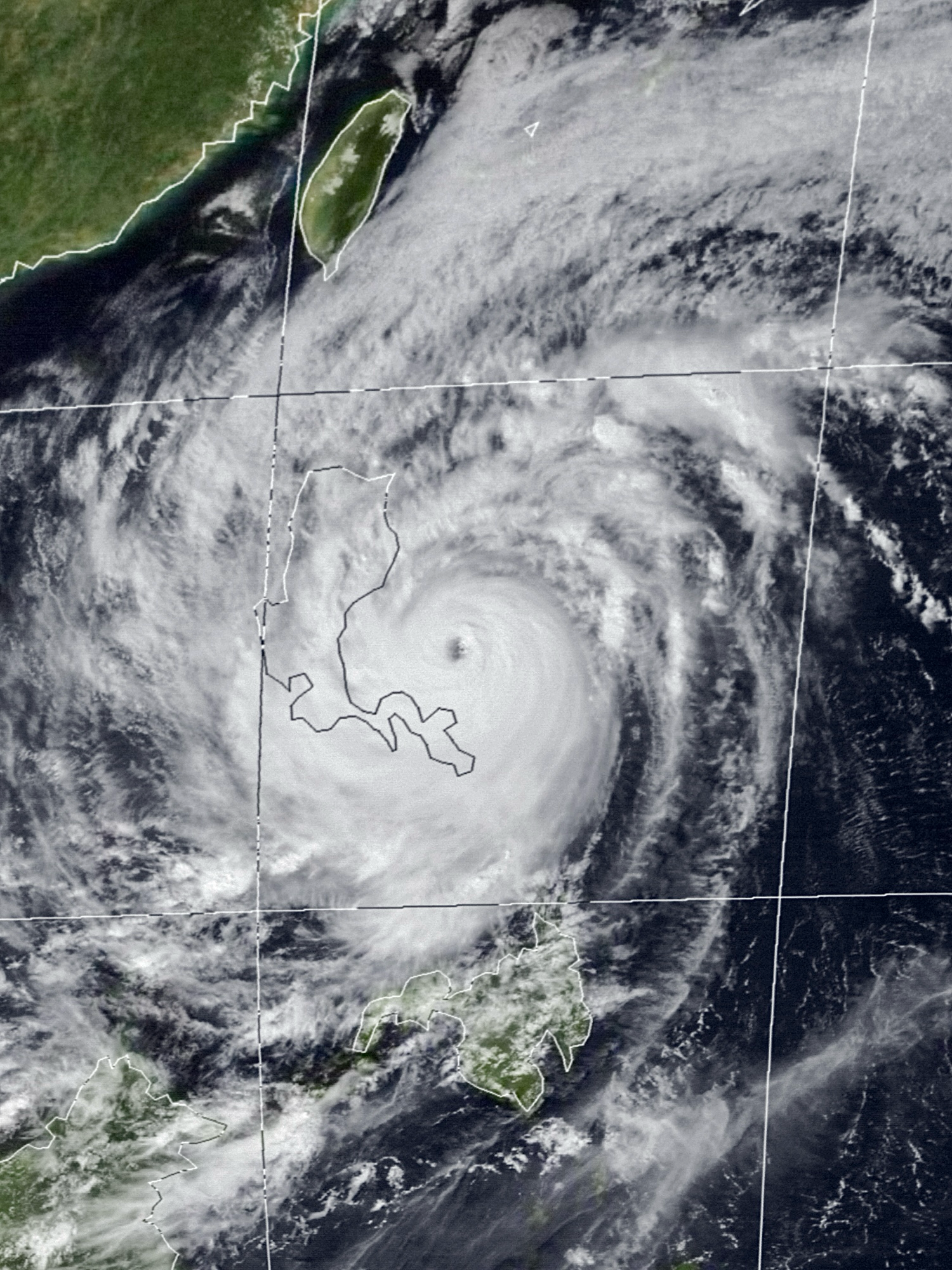
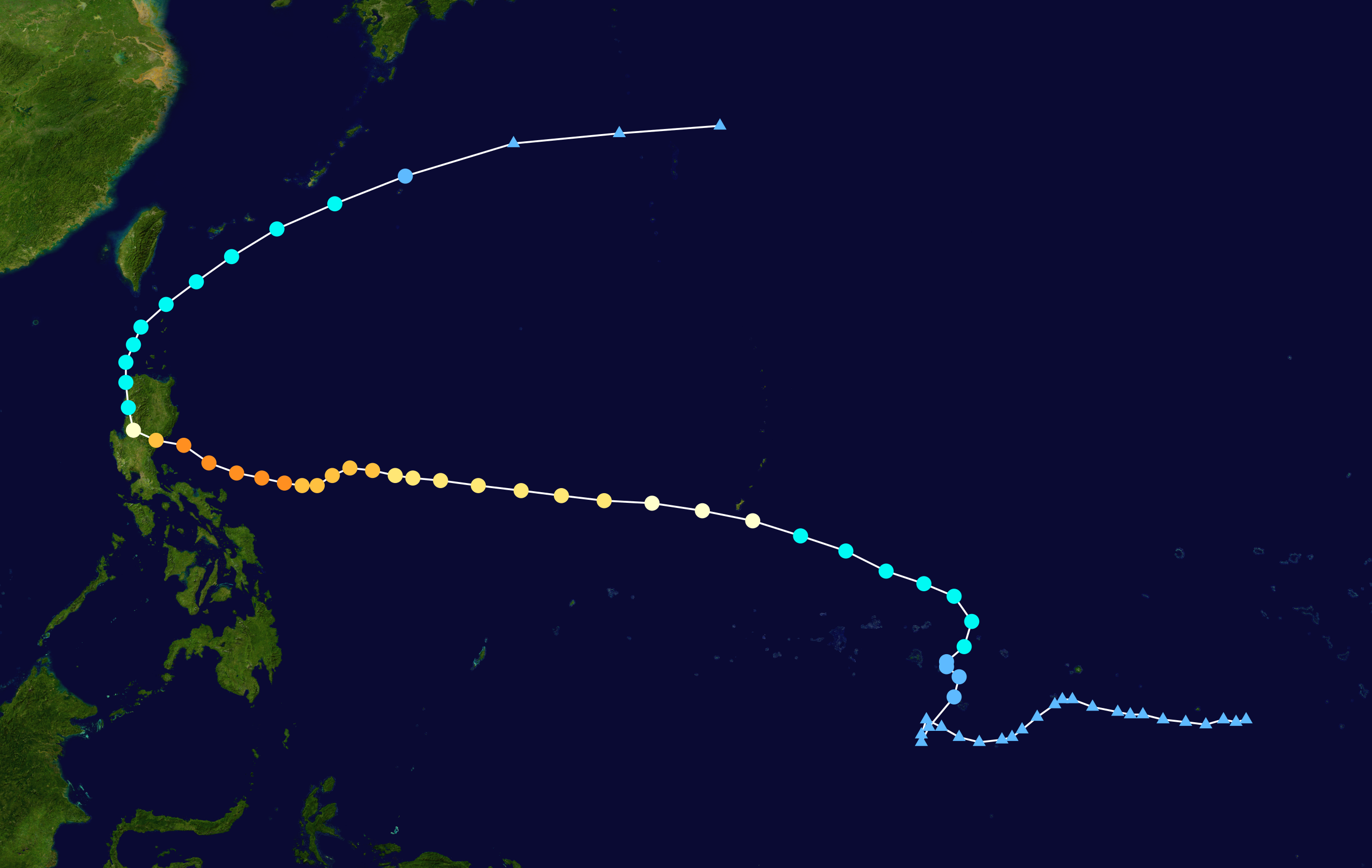
- Duration: October 28 – November 7
- Peak intensity: 185 km/h (115 mph) (10-min); 925 hPa (mbar)

A tropical disturbance was noted south of Truk on October 28 and erratically moved east towards the atoll. The disturbance was named Betty on the 29th as it moved northwestward and brushed Guam, causing moderate crop damage. A day later on the 30th, Betty was upgraded to a typhoon. On November 1, PAGASA began to track the storm and named it Aring. Betty intensified to a strong typhoon with winds of 225 km/h (140 mph) right before making landfall over central Luzon on November 4. Damage was estimated to be ₱1.358 billion (US$200 million), mainly in Central Luzon and Cagayan Valley. 103 deaths with 25 missing were also reported. After weakening and exiting the Philippines, Betty emerged as a weak tropical storm before transitioning to an extratropical cyclone south of Japan.

=== Tropical Storm Cary (Yoning) ===
- Tropical storm (JMA)
- Tropical storm (SSHWS)
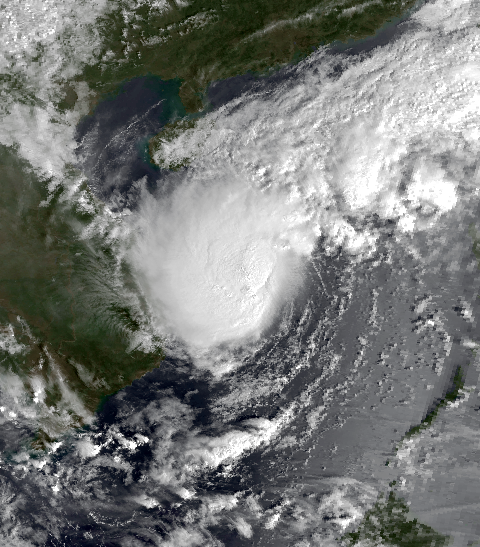
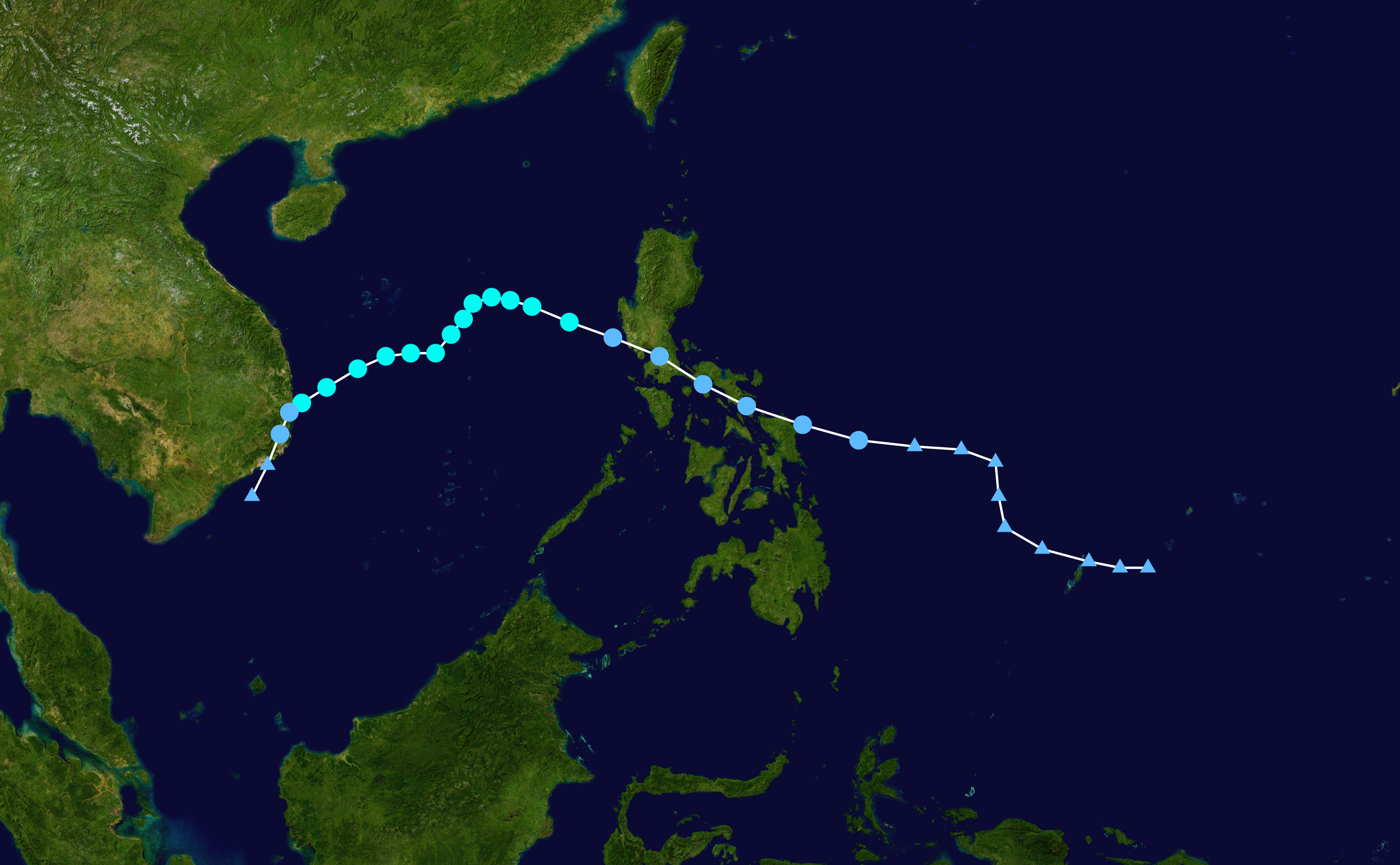
- Duration: October 28 – November 2
- Peak intensity: 85 km/h (50 mph) (10-min); 996 hPa (mbar)

An area of convection developed east of Palau on October 25. All convection dissipated shortly afterward, leaving only an exposed low-level circulation center. As the storm continued to move northwestward over the next day, convection redeveloped. The tropical depression moved over the Philippines, causing minor damage of ₱2.1 million (US$264,000). Once the depression moved into the South China Sea on October 29, the JTWC named the system Cary. Cary then moved southwestwardly towards the Vietnamese coast, dissipating over Vietnam on November 2.

=== Tropical Depression Basiang ===
- Tropical depression (JMA)
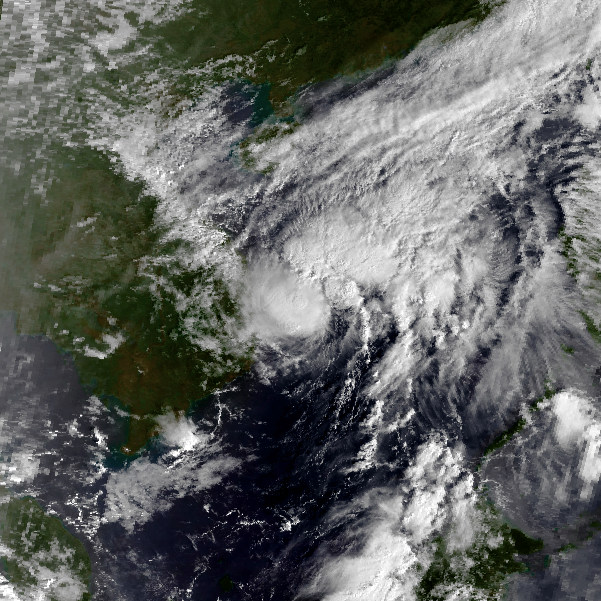
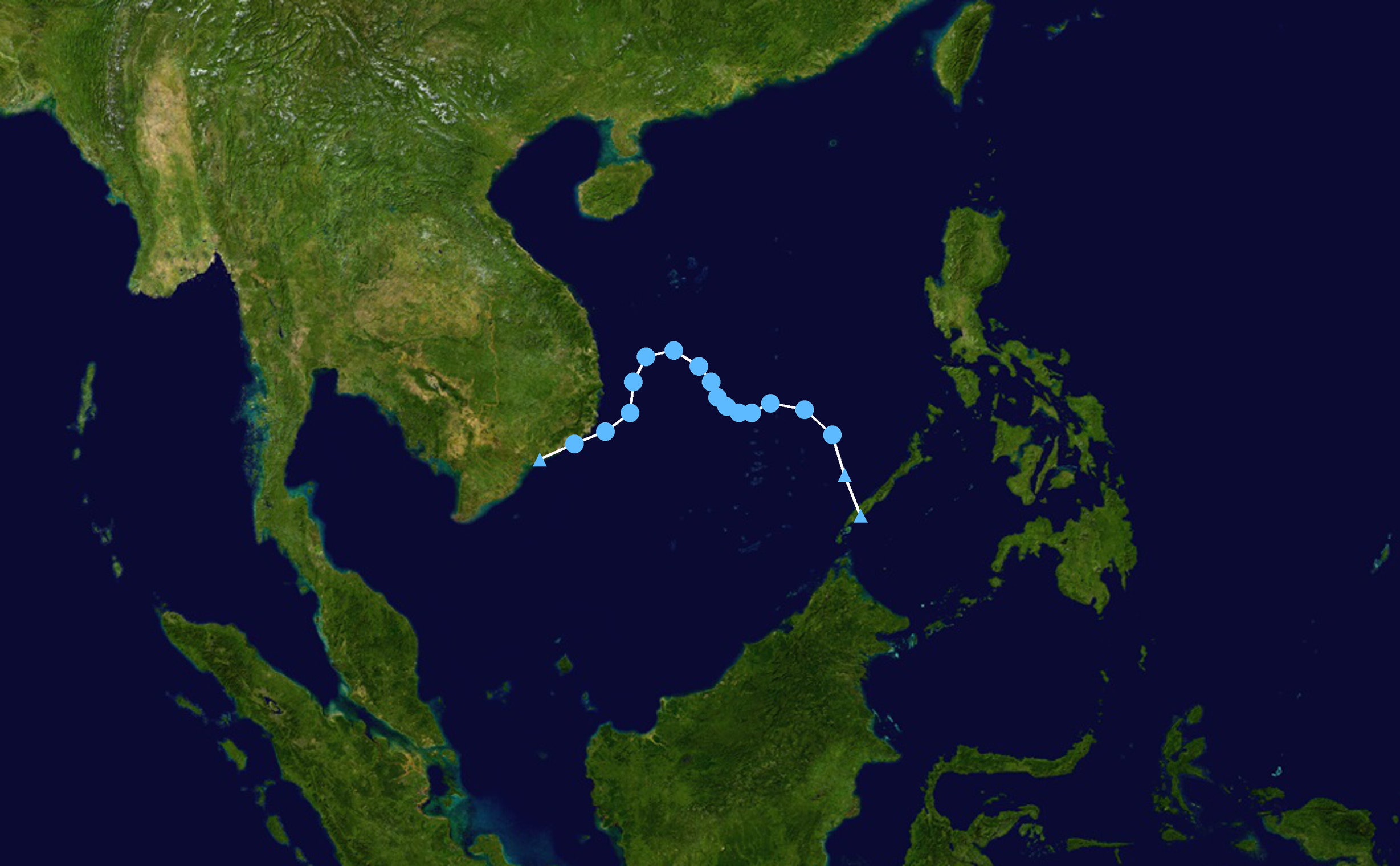
- Duration: November 13 – November 16
- Peak intensity: 45 km/h (30 mph) (10-min); 1004 hPa (mbar)

Basiang formed in the South China Sea on November 13 before moving erratically and making landfall in Vietnam on November 16 and dissipating on the same day.

=== Typhoon Dinah ===
- Very strong typhoon (JMA)
- Category 3 typhoon (SSHWS)
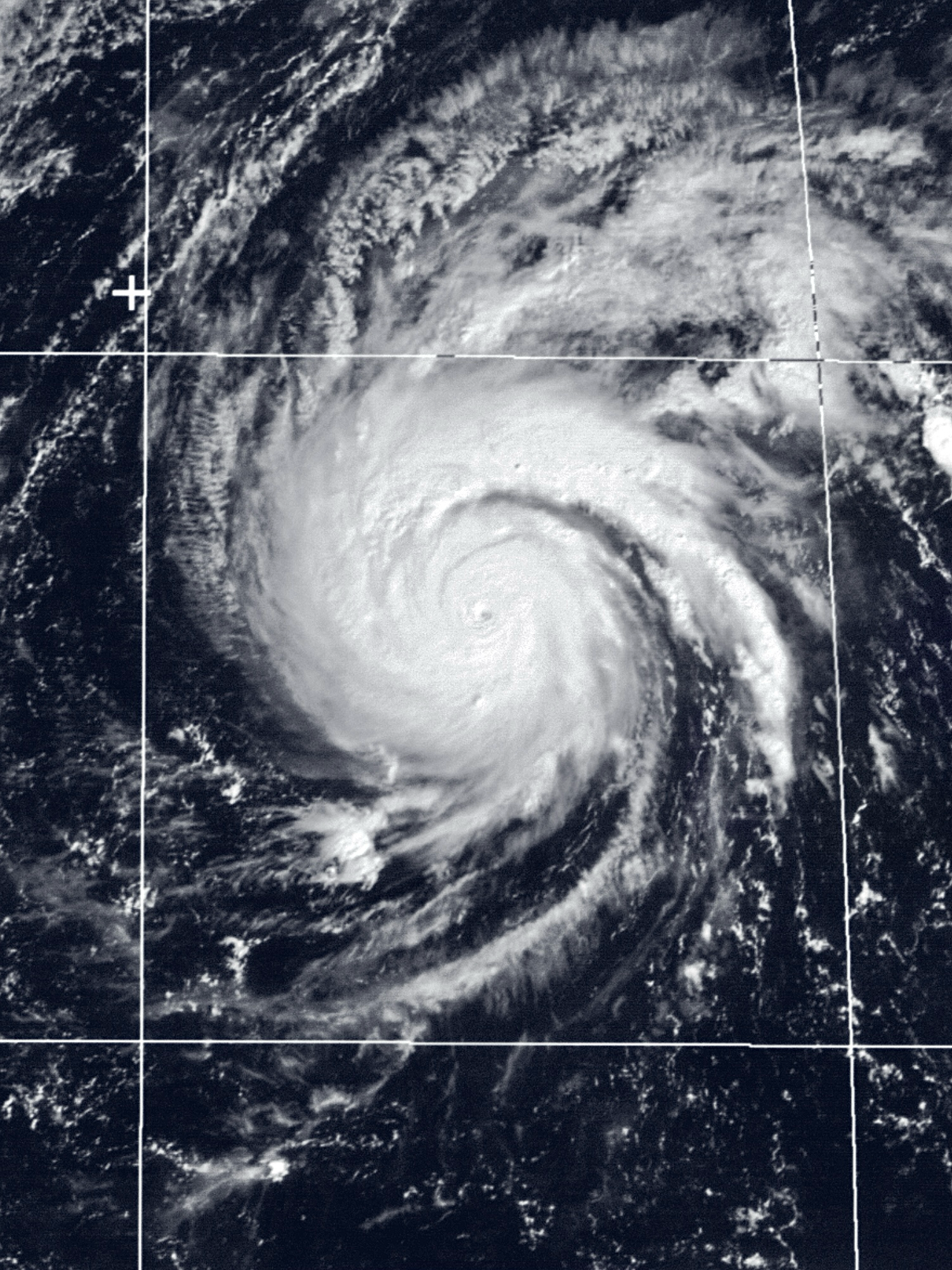
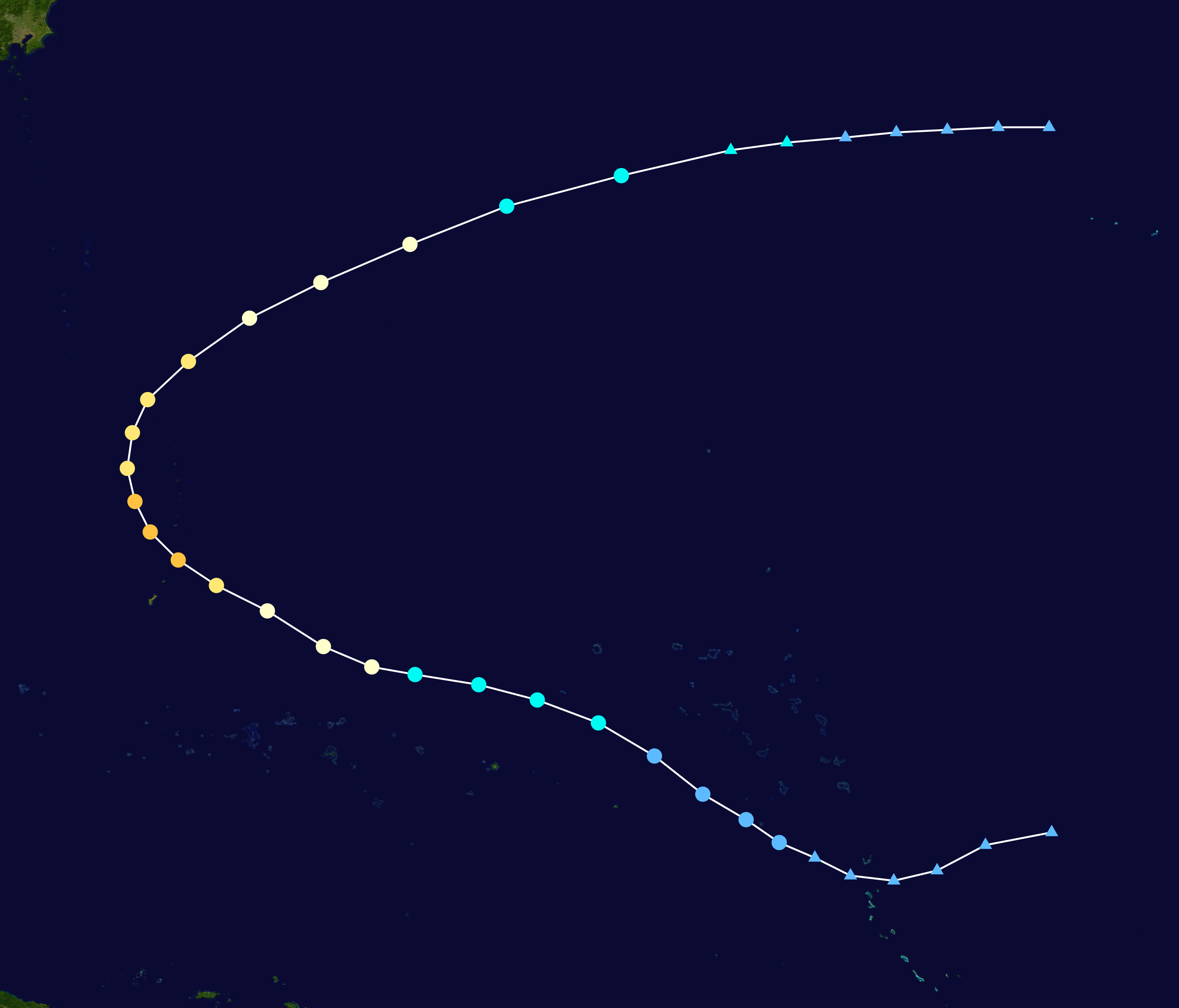
- Duration: November 18 – November 25
- Peak intensity: 165 km/h (105 mph) (10-min); 950 hPa (mbar)

A monsoon trough developed near Kwajalein Atoll on November 18. Initial development was slow and erratic for a few days before the system established a well-developed outflow pattern. The JTWC named the system Dinah on the 21st, which began to rapidly intensify and reach typhoon strength 12 hours later. As Dinah began to approach the Mariana Islands, U.S. military aircraft began to evacuate from the islands. Since Dinah was a compact storm, damage was centralized over Saipan and Tinian. On the 22nd, the island of Saipan received wind gusts up to 130 kt (150 mph; 240 km/h). Damage was extensive, with about $7 million dollars were dealt to Saipan. After crossing the Northern Mariana Islands, Dinah continued to move through the weakness in the ridge and recurve to the northeast. It accelerated and weakened before transitioning to an extratropical cyclone on the 25th.

=== Tropical Depression Kayang ===
- Tropical depression (JMA)
- Duration: November 19 – November 21
- Peak intensity: 55 km/h (35 mph) (10-min); 1004 hPa (mbar)

=== Tropical Storm Ed (Dorang) ===
- Tropical storm (JMA)
- Tropical storm (SSHWS)
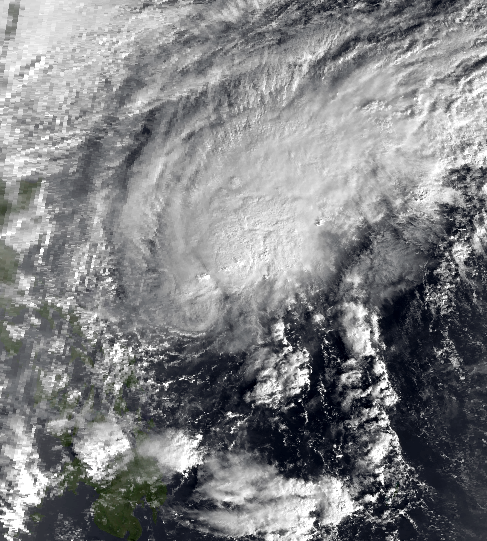
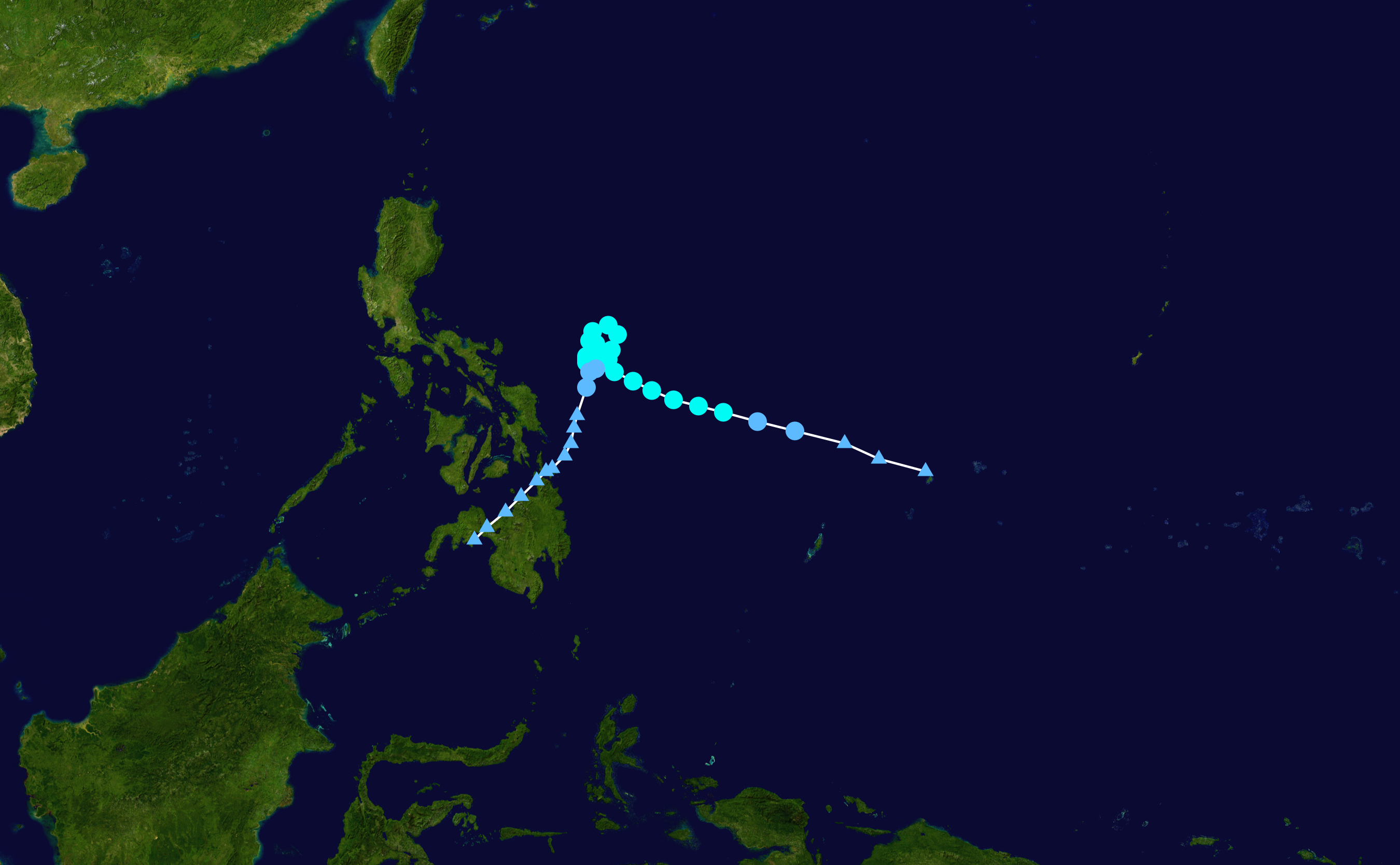
- Duration: December 14 – December 21
- Peak intensity: 85 km/h (50 mph) (10-min); 990 hPa (mbar)

A tropical disturbance was first observed near Yap on 14 December. The disturbance moved westward at between 12 and 15 kt (22 to 28 km/h) as its convective activity and overall organization continued to improve. A Tropical Cyclone Formation Alert (TCFA) was issued when a reconnaissance aircraft observed a well-defined low-level circulation with a minimum sea-level pressure of 1004 mb. The disturbance was upgraded to Tropical Storm Ed on December 15. It then became evident from synoptic analyses that Ed was moving into an area which was unfavorable for continued development. Eventually, after most of the storm's convection had been sheared off, Ed's surface center began to track to the southwest under the influence of the strong surface ridge to the north. Dissipation as a tropical cyclone was completed on the 24th as the remnants of Ed moved into northern Mindanao.

=== Other systems ===
- PAGASA tracked a tropical cyclone from 12 – 14 February, naming it Asiang.

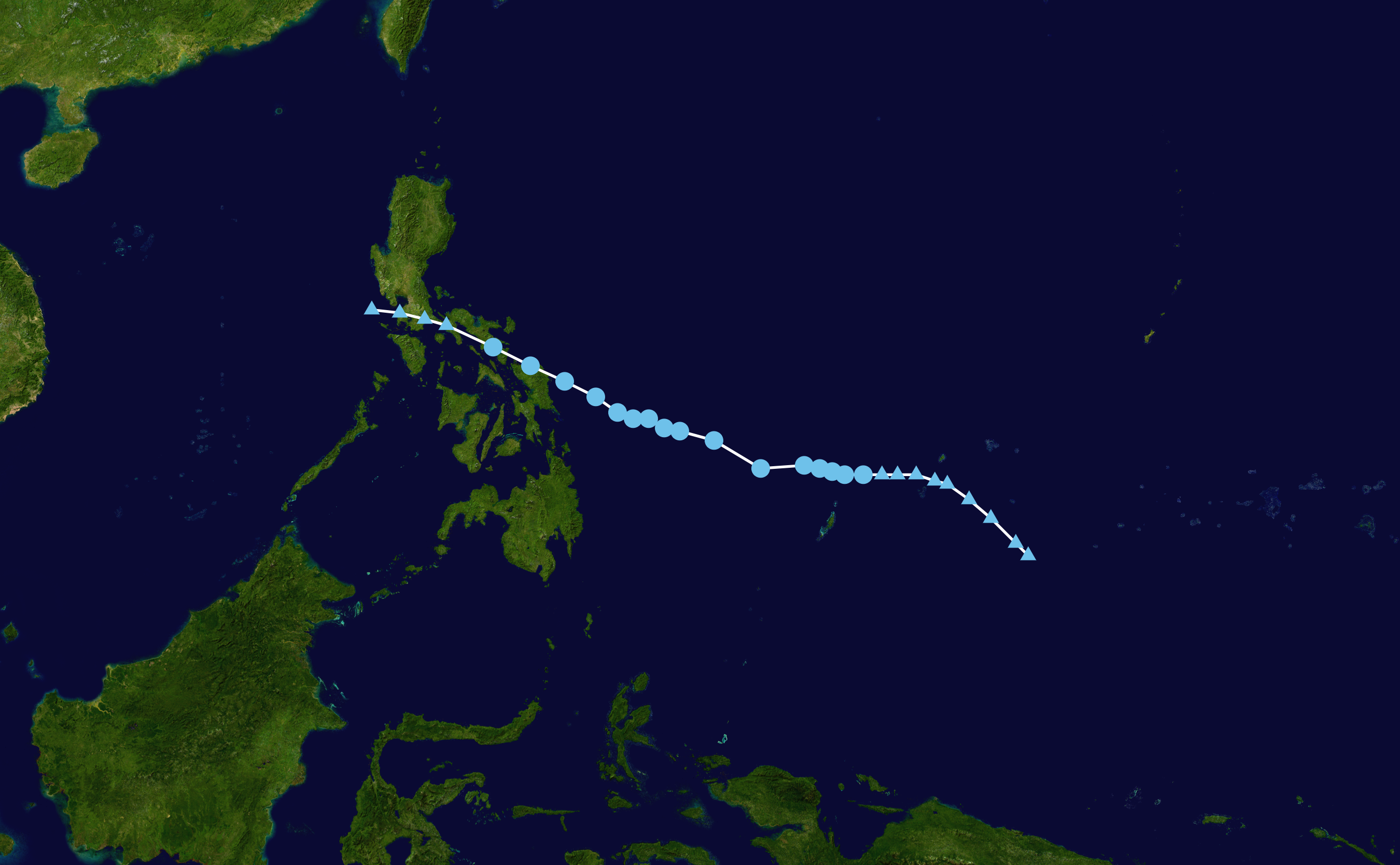
The track of Biring.

- On 16 March, the JTWC began tracking a tropical disturbance south-southeast of Guam. Four days later, the disturbance developed into a depression. Soon after, the depression crossed into the PAR, causing PAGASA to name it Biring. Persistent wind shear prevented the depression from intensifying further, and after making landfall in the Philippines on 24 March, it degenerated into a remnant low. Despite that, PAGASA kept tracking the remnants until 27 March. Across the Philippines, 4 people died due to the depression. Due to the system and a high pressure area in mainland Asia, an extratropical warning was issued for the seas near Taiwan.
- PAGASA tracked a tropical cyclone from 28 April – 1 May, naming it Konsing.
- On 28 June, a tropical depression formed east of the Philippines. Two days later, PAGASA began tracking the disturbance, naming it Isang. After it made two landfalls in the Philippines, PAGASA stopped tracking the depression on 2 July. The depression dissipated the next day.
- On 15 July, the JTWC began tracking a tropical disturbance near the Philippines. The next day, PAGASA began tracking the system, naming it Maring. The next day, the JTWC recognized it as a depression, just as it exited the PAR. After making landfall in China two days later, the JTWC stopped tracking the depression.
- On 12 August, the JTWC began tracking a tropical disturbance south of Guam. Tracking west-northwestward, two days later, they issued a TCFA on the system as it neared Luzon. Early the next day, prior to making landfall, both PAGASA and the JTWC designated the system as a tropical depression, with the former agency naming it Paring. In the Philippines, Paring rapidly weakened, and after crossing into the South China Sea, becoming a remnant low on 16 August. PAGASA kept tracking the remnants until the next day. Scattered showers affiliated with the depression were recorded in Hong Kong.
- The China Meteorological Administration (CMA) tracked a tropical depression from 26 – 31 August.
- On 30 August, a tropical depression formed east of the Philippines. Two days later, PAGASA began tracking the disturbance, naming it Seniang. Despite dissipating on 2 September, PAGASA kept tracking the remnants until 4 September.
- On 3 September, the CMA noted that a tropical depression had formed in the South China. After making landfall in Vietnam three days later, it dissipated.

== Storm names ==
During the season 24 named tropical cyclones developed in the Western Pacific and were named by the Joint Typhoon Warning Center, when it was determined that they had become tropical storms. These names were contributed to a revised list which started in 1979.

Carmen	Dom	Ellen	Forrest	Georgia	Herbert	Ida	Joe	Kim	Lex	Marge	Norris
Orchid	Percy	Ruth	Sperry	Thelma	Vernon	Wynne	Alex	Betty	Cary	Dinah	Ed

=== Philippines ===
Asiang	Biring	Konsing	Ditang	Edeng
Gloring	Huaning	Isang	Lusing	Maring
Nitang	Osang	Paring	Reming	Seniang
Toyang	Unsang	Welpring	Yoning	
Auxiliary list
				Aring
Basiang	Kayang	Dorang	Enang (unused)	Grasing (unused)

The Philippine Atmospheric, Geophysical and Astronomical Services Administration uses its own naming scheme for tropical cyclones in their area of responsibility. PAGASA assigns names to tropical depressions that form within their area of responsibility and any tropical cyclone that might move into their area of responsibility. Should the list of names for a given year prove to be insufficient, names are taken from an auxiliary list, the first 6 of which are published each year before the season starts. Names not retired from this list will be used again in the 1984 season. This is the same list used for the 1976 season, with the exception of Ditang, which replaced Didang. PAGASA uses its own naming scheme that starts in the Filipino alphabet, with names of Filipino female names ending with "ng" (A, B, K, D, etc.). Names that were not assigned/going to use are marked in gray.

== Season effects ==
This table will list all the storms that developed in the northwestern Pacific Ocean west of the International Date Line and north of the equator during 1980. It will include their intensity, duration, name, areas affected, deaths, and damage totals. Classification and intensity values will be based on estimations conducted by the JMA, the JTWC, and/or PAGASA. Peak wind speeds are in ten-minute sustained standards unless otherwise noted. All damage figures will be in 1981 USD. Damages and deaths from a storm will include when the storm was a precursor wave or an extratropical low.

Name	Dates	Peak intensity			Areas affected	Damage (USD)	Deaths	Ref(s).
Name	Dates	Category	Wind speed	Pressure	Areas affected	Damage (USD)	Deaths	Ref(s).
Asiang	February 12–14	Tropical depression	55 km/h (35 mph)	1006 hPa (29.71 inHg)	Philippines	None	None	
TD	February 23–28	Tropical depression	Not specified	1006 hPa (29.71 inHg)	Caroline Islands, Mariana Islands	None	None	
01W (Biring)	March 19–28	Tropical depression	55 km/h (35 mph)	1006 hPa (29.71 inHg)	Caroline Islands, Philippines	None	None	
Carmen	April 5–7	Severe tropical storm	110 km/h (70 mph)	985 hPa (29.09 inHg)	Marshall Islands	None	None	
Konsing	April 28–14	Tropical depression	55 km/h (35 mph)	1006 hPa (29.71 inHg)	Philippines	None	None	
Dom (Ditang)	May 7–22	Typhoon	155 km/h (100 mph)	960 hPa (28.35 inHg)	Caroline Islands, Philippines	$320,000	None	
Ellen	May 7–22	Violent typhoon	195 km/h (120 mph)	930 hPa (27.46 inHg)	Mariana Islands	None	None	
Forrest (Gloring)	May 19–26	Severe tropical storm	100 km/h (65 mph)	992 hPa (29.29 inHg)	Caroline Islands, Philippines, Ryukyu Islands	$120,000	None	
Georgia (Edeng)	May 19–25	Severe tropical storm	100 km/h (65 mph)	980 hPa (28.94 inHg)	China	None	None	
Herbert (Huaning)	June 22–29	Severe tropical storm	95 km/h (60 mph)	990 hPa (29.23 inHg)	Philippines, South China	None	None	
Isang	June 29 – July 2	Tropical depression	45 km/h (30 mph)	998 hPa (29.47 inHg)	Philippines	None	None	
TD	July 3–4	Tropical depression	Not specified	1004 hPa (29.65 inHg)	Caroline Islands	None	None	
Ida (Lusing)	July 5–13	Typhoon	130 km/h (85 mph)	960 hPa (28.35 inHg)	Philippines, Taiwan, China	$932,000	None	
10W (Maring)	July 15–19	Tropical depression	55 km/h (35 mph)	1000 hPa (29.53 inHg)	Philippines, South China	None	None	
Joe (Nitang)	July 15–24	Typhoon	155 km/h (100 mph)	940 hPa (27.76 inHg)	Philippines, South China, Vietnam	$14.5 million	351	
Kim (Osang)	July 19–27	Very strong typhoon	185 km/h (115 mph)	910 hPa (26.87 inHg)	Philippines, South China, Taiwan	Unknown	41	
Lex	July 28 – August 8	Typhoon	140 km/h (85 mph)	960 hPa (28.35 inHg)	Soviet Union	None	None	
Marge	August 8–15	Very strong typhoon	165 km/h (105 mph)	945 hPa (27.91 inHg)	None	None	None	
TD	August 10–12	Tropical depression	Not specified	1006 hPa (29.71 inHg)	None	None	None	
14W (Paring)	July 15–19	Tropical depression	55 km/h (35 mph)	1000 hPa (29.53 inHg)	Philippines, South China	None	None	
TD	August 22–23	Tropical depression	Not specified	1006 hPa (29.71 inHg)	None	None	None	
Norris (Reming)	July 28 – August 8	Very strong typhoon	175 km/h (110 mph)	945 hPa (27.91 inHg)	Taiwan, Ryukyu Islands, East China	None	None	
TD	August 26	Tropical depression	Not specified	1000 hPa (29.53 inHg)	Philippines	None	None	
Seniang	August 30	Tropical depression	45 km/h (30 mph)	1006 hPa (29.71 inHg)	None	None	None	
Orchid (Toyang)	September 4–11	Typhoon	130 km/h (80 mph)	960 hPa (28.35 inHg)	Japan	$27.5 million	53	
TD	September 4–6	Tropical depression	Not specified	1000 hPa (29.53 inHg)	Vietnam, Laos	None	None	
Ruth	September 12–16	Severe tropical storm	100 km/h (65 mph)	980 hPa (28.94 inHg)	South China, Vietnam, Laos	Unknown	106	
Percy (Undang)	September 13–19	Very strong typhoon	185 km/h (115 mph)	915 hPa (27.02 inHg)	Philippines, Taiwan, China	Unknown	7	
TD	September 25	Tropical depression	Not specified	1010 hPa (29.83 inHg)	Vietnam	None	None	
TD	October 5–8	Tropical depression	Not specified	1004 hPa (29.65 inHg)	Mariana Islands	None	None	
TD	October 27–28	Tropical depression	Not specified	1004 hPa (29.65 inHg)	Vietnam	None	None	
TD	October 28–29	Tropical depression	Not specified	1004 hPa (29.65 inHg)	Vietnam	None	None	
Basiang	November 13–16	Tropical depression	45 km/h (30 mph)	1004 hPa (29.65 inHg)	Vietnam	None	None	
Kayang	November 19–21	Tropical depression	55 km/h (35 mph)	1004 hPa (29.65 inHg)	Mariana Islands	None	None	
Season aggregates
44 systems	February 12 – December 21, 1980		220 km/h (140 mph)	890 hPa (26.28 inHg)		$280 million	493	

== See also ==
- List of Pacific typhoon seasons
- 1980 Pacific hurricane season
- 1980 Atlantic hurricane season
- 1980 North Indian Ocean cyclone season
- Australian cyclone seasons: 1979–80, 1980–81
- South Pacific cyclone seasons: 1979–80, 1980–81
- South-West Indian Ocean cyclone seasons: 1979–80, 1980–81
