= Typhoon Betty (1980) =

Pacific typhoon in 1980

Typhoon Betty (Aring)
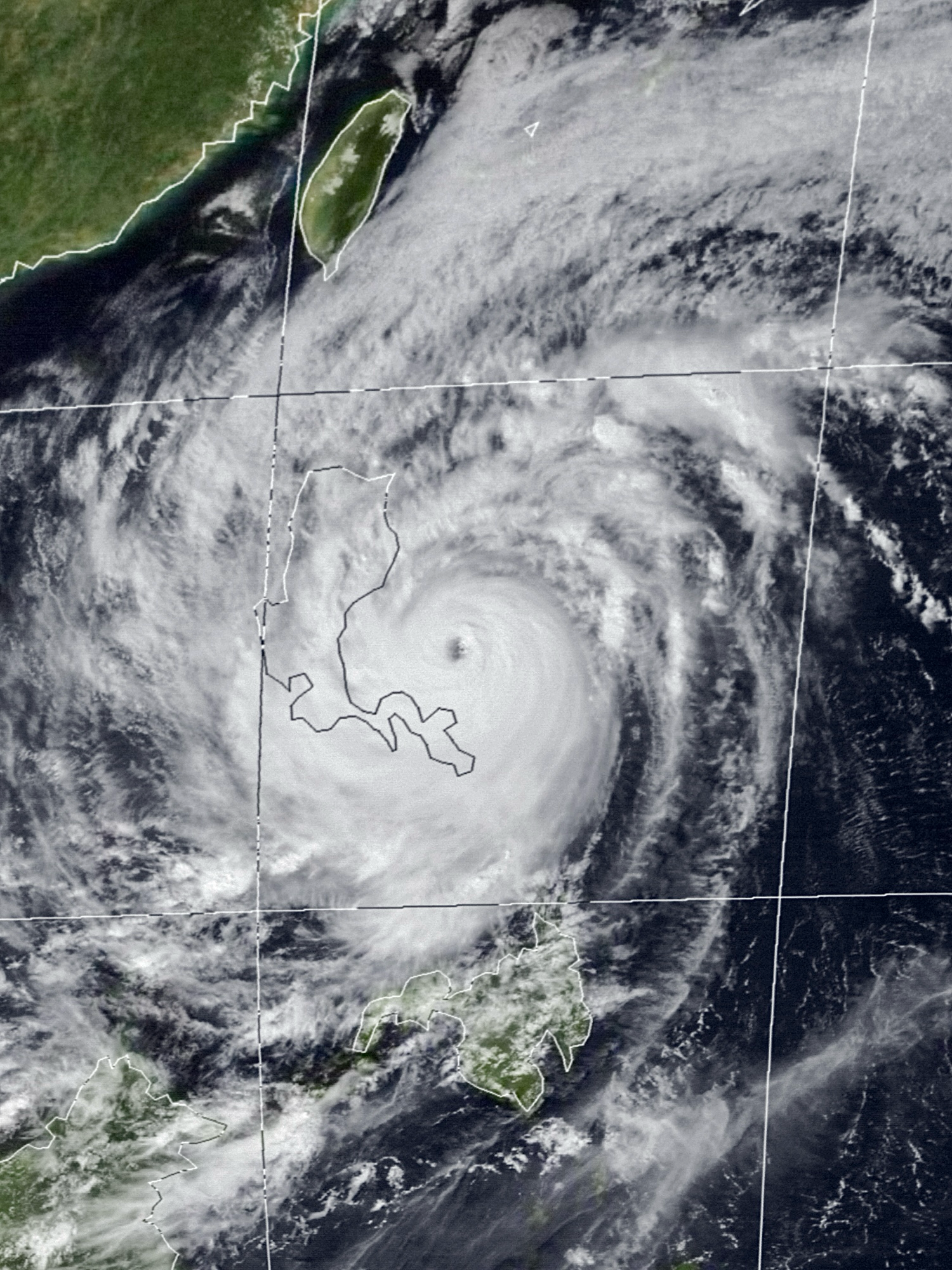
- Typhoon Betty at peak intensity whilst approaching Luzon on November 4

Meteorological history
- Formed: October 28, 1980
- Dissipated: November 8, 1980

Very strong typhoon
- 10-minute sustained (JMA)
- Highest winds: 185 km/h (115 mph)
- Lowest pressure: 925 hPa (mbar); 27.32 inHg

Category 4-equivalent typhoon
- 1-minute sustained (SSHWS/JTWC)
- Highest winds: 230 km/h (145 mph)
- Lowest pressure: 928 hPa (mbar); 27.40 inHg

Overall effects
- Fatalities: 101
- Damage: $181 million (1980 USD)
- Areas affected: Guam; Philippines
- IBTrACS
- Part of the 1980 Pacific typhoon season

Typhoon Betty, known in the Philippines as Typhoon Aring, was the strongest typhoon to strike the Philippines in ten years. An area of disturbed weather developed on October 27, 1980, near Truk Atoll. After turning east from south, the disturbance was classified as a tropical storm on October 29 as it passed near Guam, causing only minor damage. Following a turn to the west-northwest, Betty attained typhoon intensity the next day. On November 4, Betty peaked in intensity. Later that day, Betty moved ashore over Luzon, introducing a rapid weakening trend. Over land, Betty then began to turn north due to a weakening subtropical ridge to its north and a trough offshore Taiwan. By November 8, Betty, after moving offshore, had completed its transition into an extratropical cyclone, and dissipated that same day.

Across the Philippines, 101 casualties were reported. More than 29,000 homes were damaged and over 5,000 houses were leveled, resulting in 229,000 people homeless. A total of 70 villages sustained flooding. In all, Typhoon Betty inflicted $181 million (1980 USD) in damage, with $43.1 million from crops, $116 million from public property, and $21.7 million from private property. (Note: All currencies are converted to United States Dollars using Philippines Measuring worth with an exchange rate of the year 1980.) Following the storm, 11 provinces were declared a disaster area.

== Meteorological history ==
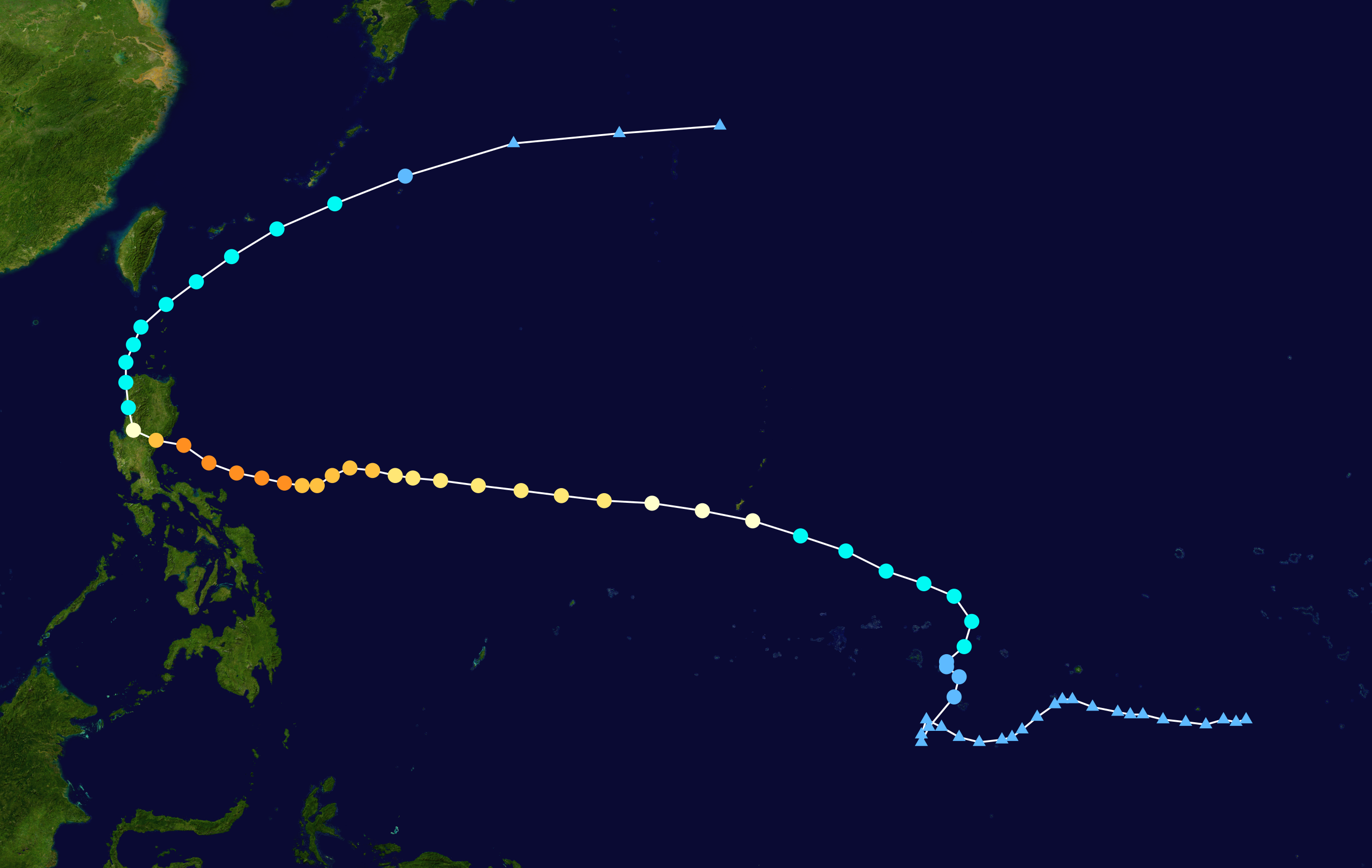
Map plotting the storm's track and intensity, according to the Saffir–Simpson scale Map key Saffir–Simpson scale Tropical depression (≤38 mph, ≤62 km/h) Tropical storm (39–73 mph, 63–118 km/h) Category 1 (74–95 mph, 119–153 km/h) Category 2 (96–110 mph, 154–177 km/h) Category 3 (111–129 mph, 178–208 km/h) Category 4 (130–156 mph, 209–251 km/h) Category 5 (≥157 mph, ≥252 km/h) Unknown Storm type Tropical cyclone Subtropical cyclone Extratropical cyclone, remnant low, tropical disturbance, or monsoon depression

Typhoon Betty, one of five tropical cyclones to develop in the Western Pacific basin during October 1980, originated from a tropical disturbance that was first noticed on October 22. Five days later, the disturbance began to show signs of organization while it was located to the south of Truk Atoll. At 00:00 UTC on October 28, the Japan Meteorological Agency (JMA) upgraded the system to a tropical depression. (Note: The Japan Meteorological Agency is the official Regional Specialized Meteorological Center for the western Pacific Ocean.) (Note: Wind estimates from the JMA and most other basins throughout the world are sustained over 10 minutes, while estimates from the United States-based Joint Typhoon Warning Center are sustained over 1 minute. 10-minute winds are about 1.14 times the amount of 1-minute winds.) Based on surface observations and data from a Hurricane Hunter aircraft, the Joint Typhoon Warning Center (JTWC) issued a Tropical Cyclone Formation Alert (TCFA) at 08:00 UTC. After initially moving south, the disturbance turned east as it approached Truk Atoll. Following an increase in the disturbance's organization, the JTWC classified the system as Tropical Depression 25 on October 29 while the JMA upgraded it to a tropical storm. Six hours later, the JTWC upgraded the depression into Tropical Storm Betty.

After moving erratically during its formative stages, Tropical Storm Betty accelerated towards the west-northwest as it passed south of Guam. Late on October 29, the JMA designated Betty a severe tropical storm. Twenty-four hours later, the JTWC upgraded Betty into a typhoon, with the JMA doing the same at 00:00 UTC on October 31. Twelve hours later, the JTWC raised the winds to 160 km/h (100 mph), equal to a low-end Category 2 hurricane on the United States-based Saffir-Simpson Hurricane Wind Scale (SSHWS). On November 1, the Philippine Atmospheric, Geophysical and Astronomical Services Administration (PAGASA) also began to track the storm and assigned it with the local name Aring. After turning due west, Betty continued to intensify, although a Hurricane Hunter penetration later on November 1 indicated no eyewall. Early on November 2, synoptic data showed a shortwave trough moving off Asia. As such, the JTWC expected Betty to re-curve near the 125th meridian east. Instead, Typhoon Betty abruptly turned southwestward. On November 3, the trough moved quickly eastward north of the system, closing Betty's window for re-curvature. Following the formation of an eye, the JMA estimated that the typhoon peaked in intensity the next day, with winds of 185 km/h (115 mph) and a barometric pressure of 925 mbar (27.3 inHg). Later that day, the JTWC estimated an intensity of 225 km/h (140 mph).

By 00:00 UTC on November 4, the JTWC amended its forecast for Typhoon Betty, projecting it to move northwest into southern Luzon and China. At 16:00 UTC that day, Betty made landfall in central Luzon south of Cape San Ildefonso, with the JTWC reporting winds of 225 km/h (140 mph) and the JMA estimating winds of 185 km/h (115 mph). As Betty weakened over land, a subtropical ridge to Betty's north broke down. Betty began to turn north in response to a shortwave through offshore Taiwan. According to both the JTWC and JMA, the cyclone had weakened below typhoon intensity once it moved back over water. Betty never regained its past intensity as it drifted northward, and at 00:00 UTC on November 8, Betty was declared an extratropical system by the JTWC. Twelve hours later, the JMA ceased tracking the system, while the cyclone was located southeast of Honshu.

== Preparations and impact ==
During its formative stages, Betty passed near Guam, where strong winds caused major crop damage and downed power lines. On October 30, the Antonio B. Won Pat International Airport was closed. Although there was no major damage on Guam, typhoon alerts were issued for Yap and Palau.

Prior to landfall, most government offices were closed throughout Luzon, where storm warnings were also posted. Philippine Airlines cancelled all domestic and some international flights. Upon making landfall in the Philippines, press reports indicated that Betty became the strongest typhoon to strike the country in a decade. In the Albay province, 440 people lost their homes due to flooding. Seven children were rescued in Tayug. In the Tarlac province, damage to rice totaled $2.7 million. A total of 455 homes were destroyed and 2,000 others were damaged across the Aurora province. The capital city of Manila suffered minor street flooding, especially in low-lying suburbs. Although 750 people were evacuated to shelter, the capital avoided the brunt of the typhoon. The Cagayan River in the Isabela province overflowed its banks, which resulted in 30,000 citizens homeless. In the same province, half the town of Cabagan was left underwater. In Cagayan Valley, 8,000 pupils were stranded. All roads leading to the town of Baler in the Quezon province were impassable. Five people, three of whom were children, drowned in the province of Nueva Ecija. A landslide occurred in Maliling, a village in Nueva Vizcaya province, resulting in 50 fatalities. Twenty-two bodies were recovered while the others were feared dead.

Overall, 101 people died in the Philippines. A total of 245,064 families were listed as affected, meaning that they were evacuated or homeless. Over 29,000 homes were damaged and more than 5,000 houses were destroyed, leaving 290,000 people homeless. Seventy villages were flooded. Damage was estimated at $181 million (₱1.36 billion), with $43.1 million from crops (₱324 million), $116 million from public infrastructure (₱871 million), and $21.7 million (₱163 million) from private infrastructure. (Note: All Philippine currencies are converted to United States Dollars using Philippines Measuring worth with an exchange rate of the year 1980.) At the time, Betty was the third costliest tropical cyclone to affect the Philippines, behind Typhoon Joan and Typhoon Kate in 1970 and Typhoon Rita in 1978. The typhoon hit the same areas were affected by Typhoon Joe and Typhoon Kim earlier that summer. Following the storm, army trucks and a C-47 plane were mobilized to carry relief goods. Eleven provinces and 113 towns were declared a disaster area by President Ferdinand Marcos.

== See also ==
- Other similar late-season typhoons that hit Luzon:
  - Typhoon Patsy (1970)
  - Typhoon Dot (1985)
  - Typhoon Lynn (1987)
