= List of storms named Barijat =

The name Barijat (Marshallese: parijet, [pʲærˠijtʲɛtˠ]) has been used for two tropical cyclones in the western North Pacific Ocean. The name was contributed by the United States and refers to coastal lagoon shores impacted by typhoons in Marshallese. It replaced the name Utor, after it was retired following the 2013 Pacific typhoon season.

- Tropical Storm Barijat (2018) (T1823, 27W, Neneng) – a weak tropical storm that caused flooding in the far northern regions of the Philippines and struck Southern China.
- Tropical Storm Barijat (2024) (T2419, 21W) – a weak tropical storm which stayed at sea.

Preceded by Burapha	Pacific typhoon season names Barijat	Succeeded by Hoaban
