= List of storms named Osang =

The name Osang has been used for ten tropical cyclones in the Western Pacific Ocean. All were named by either the Philippine Atmospheric, Geophysical and Astronomical Services Administration (PAGASA) or its predecessor, the Philippine Weather Bureau.

- Tropical Storm Grace (1964) (T6410, 13W, Osang-Paring) – a moderately strong tropical storm which made a cyclonic loop in the Philippine Sea.
- Typhoon Gloria (1968) (T6819, 23W, Osang) – a Category 2-equivalent typhoon that stayed in the open ocean.
- Tropical Storm Grace (1972) (T7219, 19W, Osang) – another erratically-moving tropical storm which stayed just off the coast of southern Luzon.
- Tropical Storm Dot (1976) (T7615, 15W, Osang) – a tropical system that impacted East China, South Korea, and Japan.
- Typhoon Kim (1980) (T8009, 11W, Osang) – a powerful typhoon which made landfall in Northern Luzon, claiming at least 40 lives.
- Tropical Depression Osang (1984) – a system which was only recognized by PAGASA.
- Tropical Depression Osang (1988) – another disturbance that was only monitored by PAGASA.
- Typhoon Angela (1992) (T9224, 24W, Osang) – an erratic and long-lived typhoon which eventually hit Vietnam, killing 49 people.
- Typhoon Violet (1996) (T9617, 26W, Osang) – a strong typhoon that brought considerable impacts to eastern Japan.
- Typhoon Saomai (2000) (T0014, 22W, Osang) – a long-lived, violent typhoon which severely affected Japan and the Korean Peninsula, becoming one of the costliest tropical cyclones in the Western Pacific Ocean.

== See also ==
- List of storms named Esang – also used in the Western Pacific Ocean.
- List of storms named Isang – also used in the Western Pacific Ocean and the South-West Indian Ocean.

| Preceded by Ningning | Pacific typhoon season names Osang | Succeeded by Paring |
