= List of storms named Nitang =

The name Nitang was used for six tropical cyclones in the Philippines by PAGASA and its predecessor, the Philippine Weather Bureau, in the Western Pacific Ocean.

- Typhoon Flossie (1964) (T6409, Nitang) – a minimal, Category 1-equivalent typhoon which brushed the Ryukyu Islands before hitting East China and the Korean Peninsula.
- Typhoon Elaine (1968) (T6817, 21W, Nitang) – an intense and long-lived Category 5-equivalent super typhoon which made landfall in Northern Luzon and southeastern China.
- Typhoon Flossie (1972) (T7218, 18W, Nitang) – another Category 1-equivalent typhoon that hit Luzon and Central Vietnam.
- Typhoon Billie (1976) (T7613, 13W, Nitang) – a powerful Category 4-equivalent typhoon which crossed the Ryukyu Islands, Taiwan, and Mainland China.
- Typhoon Joe (1980) (T8008, 09W, Nitang) – a deadly Category 3-equivalent typhoon that affected the Philippines, China, and Vietnam, claiming 351 lives.
- Typhoon Ike (1984) (T8411, 13W, Nitang) – a Category 4-equivalent typhoon which devastated the Philippines and eventually also impacted China, killing at least 1,474 people.

The name Nitang was retired by PAGASA due to the severe damage and destruction brought by its 1984 iteration. It was replaced by Ningning from the 1988 season.

== See also ==
- List of storms named Ditang – a similar name which was also used in the Western Pacific Ocean.
