= Typhoon Olga (1976) =

Pacific typhoon in 1976

Typhoon Olga (Didang)
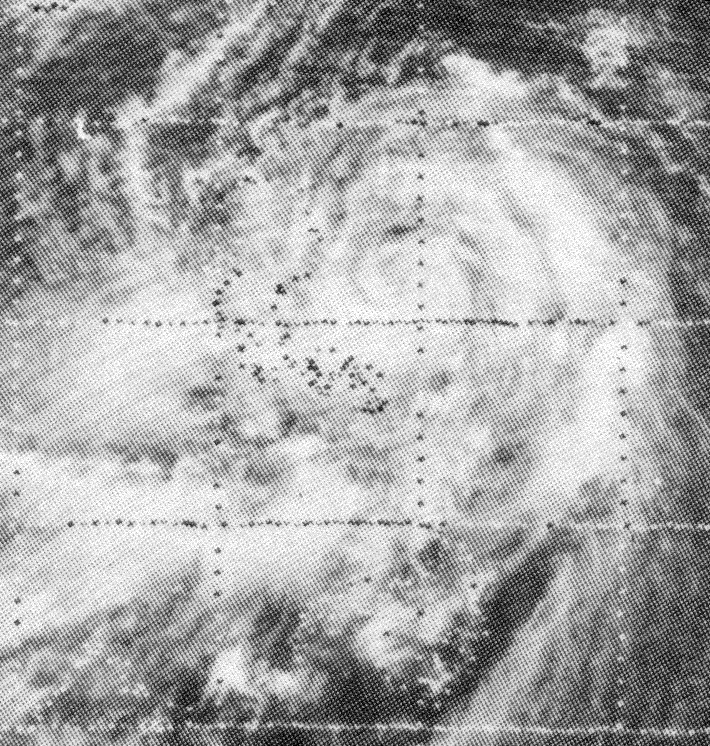
- Olga on May 21, rapidly intensifying prior to landfall on the next day.

Meteorological history
- Formed: May 10, 1976
- Dissipated: May 28, 1976

Typhoon
- 10-minute sustained (JMA)
- Lowest pressure: 940 hPa (mbar); 27.76 inHg

Category 3-equivalent typhoon
- 1-minute sustained (SSHWS/JTWC)
- Highest winds: 185 km/h (115 mph)
- Lowest pressure: 934 hPa (mbar); 27.58 inHg

Overall effects
- Fatalities: 374
- Damage: $70 million (1976 USD)
- Areas affected: Philippines, Ryukyu Islands
- Part of the 1976 Pacific typhoon season

Typhoon Olga, known in the Philippines as Typhoon Didang, was a strong typhoon that brought widespread damage to the Philippines in May 1976, causing what was called the "worst flooding in 30 years". The storm killed over 300 people and displaced over 1.3 million others. The storm originated from an area of several surface circulations on May 4, in which the JTWC first noted its predecessor as a southwestward-moving storm on May 12. However, it was first tracked by the JMA on May 11. Nevertheless, it strengthened to a tropical storm while continuing its motion and track. However, it weakened to a tropical depression as it slowly interacted with another circulation to its east, in which the new system dominated over the existing one. The JMA and JTWC still treated the storm as Olga as it entered the area of responsibility of the Philippines, in which the state weather bureau tracked the system as "Didang". Despite the presence of shear around the storm, the system slowly consolidated and grew as it neared the country and few hours prior to landfall, it rapidly intensified to a Category 3 storm before its landfall over Aurora on May 21. Upon inland, Olga subsequently weakened to a tropical storm as it slowed down over Central Luzon before finally exiting through the South China Sea on May 24. There, it slightly strengthened to a tropical storm as it neared land again, this time over Northern Luzon before becoming absorbed by a subtropical disturbance to the south of Okinawa on May 28, in which the JTWC last monitored the system one day prior. However, the JMA continued to track the system along with Olga's remnants until they dropped their advisories while near the International Date Line on May 31.

As a slow-moving system, Olga caused copious amounts of rainfall over the Philippines, with one area recording 50 inches of rain (1,300 mm), becoming one of the wettest tropical cyclones the island nation had ever endured. 150 km/h (95 mph) winds were also recorded at Iba, where sets for the movie Apocalypse Now were destroyed and its staff were forced to shelter in hotels and houses. 374 people were killed and over 1.3 million were left homeless. Many public infrastructures including a dam, dikes and other reservoirs were damaged while agricultural crops were inundated by the storm's rains. Further, floods affected the wide swath of Luzon, with the Central portion of the island being the most affected. Damages from the storm were officially estimated by the President at that time, Ferdinand Marcos to be at $70 million. Meanwhile, its deaths and the resulting destruction resulted in its local name “Didang” being retired.

== Meteorological history ==
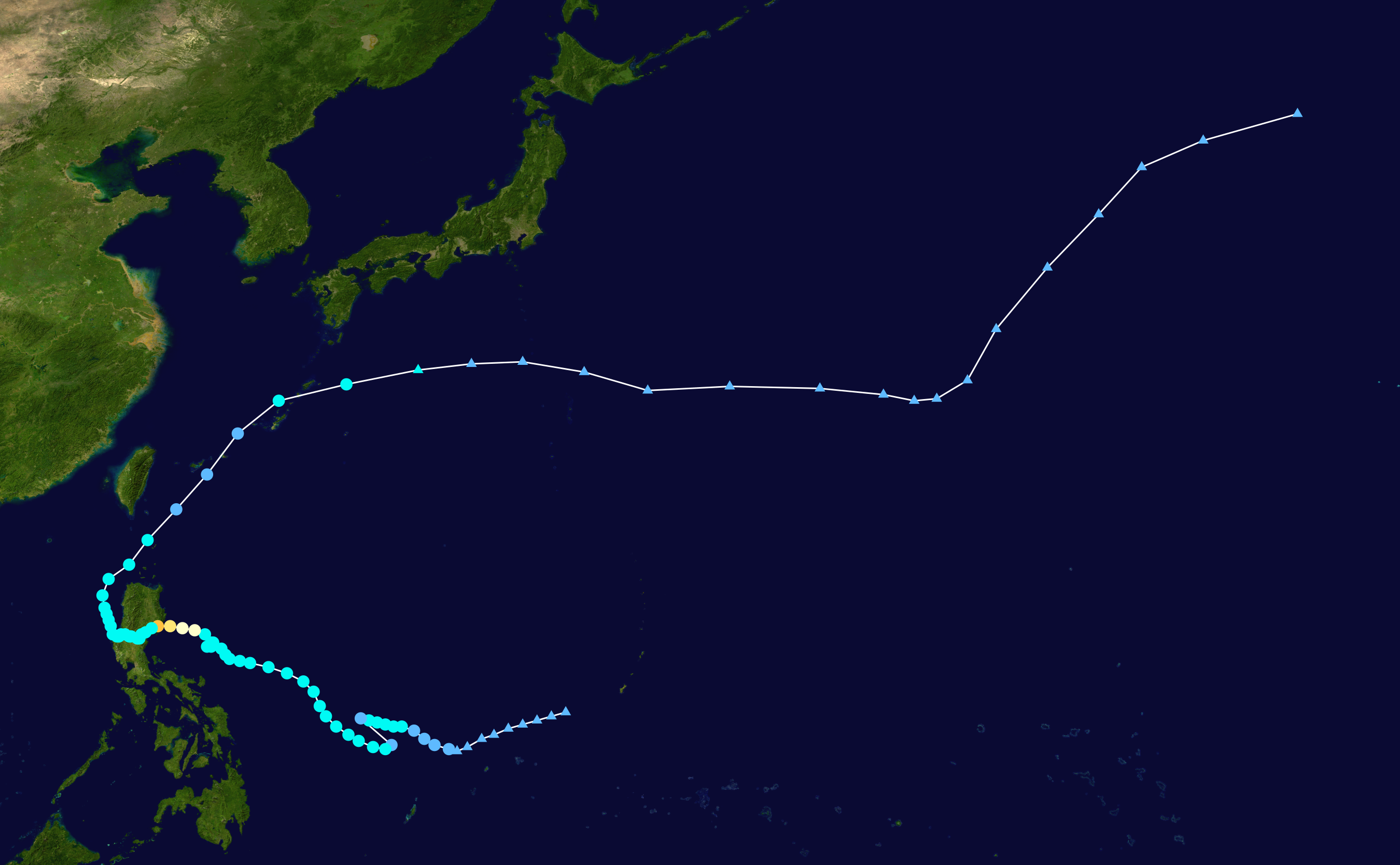
Map plotting the storm's track and intensity, according to the Saffir–Simpson scale Map key Saffir–Simpson scale Tropical depression (≤38 mph, ≤62 km/h) Tropical storm (39–73 mph, 63–118 km/h) Category 1 (74–95 mph, 119–153 km/h) Category 2 (96–110 mph, 154–177 km/h) Category 3 (111–129 mph, 178–208 km/h) Category 4 (130–156 mph, 209–251 km/h) Category 5 (≥157 mph, ≥252 km/h) Unknown Storm type Tropical cyclone Subtropical cyclone Extratropical cyclone, remnant low, tropical disturbance, or monsoon depression

On May 4, the JTWC noted multiple surface circulation zones inside a trough near Micronesia. For some of its early life, this precursor circulation generally moved southwestward, although the Japan Meteorological Agency (JMA) first tracked its predecessor at 18:00 UTC of May 11 as a 1,004 hectopascals (29.6 inHg) system. On May 12, the JTWC had issued a warning on the system, citing that one circulation had started to overtake the others. Six hours later, the disturbance made a west-northwest movement as being guided by the southern periphery of a subtropical ridge in the Pacific before the agency upgraded the system to a tropical storm on the next day in the afternoon.

That night, satellite imagery revealed the presence of another circulation, located 120 nautical miles (220 km; 140 mi) to the east of Olga. The new circulation interacted with the strengthening system, before the original center dissipated and its remaining convection had been absorbed by the second feature while moving west-northwest. Slowly but modest intensification prevailed over the disturbance, and the new cyclone reintensified to a tropical storm. However, both the JMA and JTWC continued tracking this system as Olga. It then inclined northwards due to a shortwave trough trailing across the westerlies on May 16 before resuming its track to the west-northwest as a result of the trough moving to the east. At this time, Olga was now tracked by PAGASA (Note: Otherwise known as the "Manila Weather Bureau", although its official name has been the Philippine Atmospheric, Geophysical, and Astronomical Services Administration since the Philippine Weather Bureau was reorganized in December 1972.) entered the Philippine Area of Responsibility (PAR) and assigned it the local name “Didang”. Olga subsequently entered an area of unfavorable wind shear caused by a 200 mb ridge inclined over the Southeast Asia and despite this, it slowly intensified while nearing the mainland Philippines. The cyclone also initiated a counterclockwise loop and slowed down as a result of a long-wave trough moving off the east coast of China. The system completed this loop on May 20 while continuing to slowly strengthen. Reconnaissance aircraft reports from 03:30 UTC and 19:47 UTC indicated that Olga started to underwent rapid intensification as a pressure drop of 44 mb (from 978 mb to 934 mb) were recorded. At approximately 00:00 UTC of the next day, Olga made landfall on the province of Aurora with an estimated maximum sustained winds of 185 km/h (115 mph) and a barometric pressure of 940 hectopascals (28 inHg), making at a Category 3 typhoon.

Upon moving inland, Olga's winds rapidly degraded to tropical storm-force winds as it passed over Baler Bay before crossing through Central Luzon. Moving with a forward speed from 2 to 4 knots, it moved to the west-southwest, before taking a westward path. Still as a gale-force system, the cyclone turned northwest before exiting through Lingayen Gulf on May 24. It subsequently reintensified slightly before turning to the northeast, this time sparing Northern Luzon a direct hit again from the system as it passed through Batanes as it inclined north-northeast. By the next day, what was Olga is now just a low-level circulation separated through its convection while accelerating away from the typhoon-stricken Philippines. The system was last tracked by the weather bureau of the Philippines on May 26 before the final advisory was issued by the JTWC at 06:00 UTC of that day while located to the east of Hengchun in Formosa (now Taiwan). The agency also noted that the remnants of Olga were absorbed into a subtropical disturbance on May 27 to the south of Okinawa, although the JMA continued to track the system until they dropped monitoring it on 12:00 UTC of May 31 near the International Date Line.

== Effects ==
The Philippines suffered a direct hit from Olga on May 21, when the system made landfall over Aurora. Along with the prevailing southwest monsoon over the country, the cyclone caused heavy rainfall along the Southern, Central and Northern portions of Luzon, causing catastrophic floods. Millions lost their homes due to the inundation and many reservoirs overflowed and burst due to continuous downpour, again affecting many individuals. The final death toll for the storm were at 374 while damages reached in millions of dollars. At Cubi Point, the rainfall exceeded over 50 inches (1,300 mm), which would place the system as one of the wettest tropical cyclones in the Philippines. The summary of the events after the storm wrecked through the country are summarized by date (Note: These are summarized by the date of newspaper wherein the information about the impacts of Olga were published.) as follows:

=== May 19 ===
On May 19, before moving inland, Olga's rainbands caused heavy rains, leading to flash floods in metropolitan Manila. 8,000 in Manila were required to leave their homes and thousands of commuters were stranded. In a suburb of Caloocan, seven feet of floodwaters were seen; navy amphibious tanks were sent to evacuate people whose are in their homes to schools for their safety. As a response to this, the Philippine President at that time, Ferdinand Marcos lifted the regular 1-4 am martial law curfew to let thousands of stranded passengers go home without any fines.

=== May 20 ===
On May 20, seven deaths were further confirmed from the storm. Olga's flooding was also described as the “worst in 30 years”, according to the authorities in the Philippines. At least 10,000 individuals forced to flee their homes in Quezon City due to over 16.1 inches (410 mm) of rain, with the said amount being confirmed by Roman L. Kintinar, the chief of the PAGASA. Tens of thousands of motorists and commuters were also stranded in capital Manila. Emergency safety shelters were built in several churches and schools throughout the area for the evacuees while the navy frogmen rescued 71 persons from a flooded residential area in an unknown place outside Manila. Ten persons were reported to have been missing there. Over than 1,500 persons were also trapped and affected by six-feet waters in Mandaluyong. Communications outside the metropolitan area were cut and authorities there said that no reports of damages were received as of that date in provinces that are also affected by Olga. As a result, President Marcos declared Manila and five other Luzon provinces in state of emergency and ordered all businesses in Manila and Quezon City to be closed except the essential operations. Floods came as workers in the city were reportedly finishing 25 inundation-control projects that were set up at that time.The Philippine Red Cross appealed help to USAID and local residents to the area for food supplies for the victims of the storm.

=== May 21 ===
The death toll further rose to 25 and 8 being missing on May 21. Sixteen of them are recovered from the rising waters on an unknown place in the country. Two light aircraft with 12 persons aboard are missing during the onslaught of the typhoon. The proclaimed state of calamity in Manila and nearby areas froze food prices and imposed penalties in hoarders and profiteers there. President Marcos also ordered the Philippine Air Force to run cloud-seeding operations in the mountainous areas north of the capital to induce rainfall away from its storm clouds to populous areas. Marcos said in news reports from the Philippines that a PAF C-47 aircraft poured sodium chloride onto Olga to contain the record rainfall it brought onto the country's capital, but it did still dropped record-heavy downpour. It is based on meeting with relief and rescue officials that Marcos did the decision to declare a state of calamity in several areas in the Philippines that are severely affected from the storm. Storm signals were continued to be raised and maintained as Olga emerges onto the South China Sea.

=== May 22 ===
A plane of 5 people crashed in a wooded hills 40 miles to the south of Manila from Leyte to the area. The death toll at that date were set at 35. PRC noted that reports from different provinces that are also hit hard by Olga were delayed due to broken power lines. A rescue official also informed the media in the country that bad weather also prevented the dispatch of planes to check the Seng Hong, a Panamanian-registered freighter that was reported to be run aground near Mamburao Bay, located to the south of the capital. 18 passengers were on board. The other aircraft, a Philippine navy plane that was bound for Manila from Palawan with seven passengers that was also affected by Olga.

=== May 24 ===
Two days later, 41 were reported dead due to Olga in the country, with the number further increasing to 47 in further reports. Three from them are from Nueva Ecija due to drowning and another three in Manila from the storm-related short circuit fire. The access roads through Manila International Airport (now Ninoy Aquino International Airport) flooded although the airport remained open for flights. In additional, communications from Manila to Zamboanga in Mindanao, where an aircraft hijacking happened on May 21 there and ended on May 24 were disrupted due to broken transmission lines in the former. Ferdinand Marcos further extended the state of calamity on the main island of Luzon on May 24 as a result of the disaster. Eight hospitals in the country also suspended patient admissions due to their emergency and admitting sections being inundated by floods. Officials there informed the United Press International from Manila that the Potrero Dike, a reservoir located 90 miles to the north of Manila overflowed during the onslaught of the storm, flooding towns near the area. Nueva Ecija was almost entirely swamped, according to Marcos. The Pampanga River also overflowed as its water rose more than three yards. Further Luzon's south, railways were disrupted as a result of Olga's rains, and the damages to crops and property were described as “extensive”. Over 100,000 people were rendered homeless. As a result, Marcos ordered the Armed Forces of the Philippines (AFP) to form rescue units.

=== May 25 ===
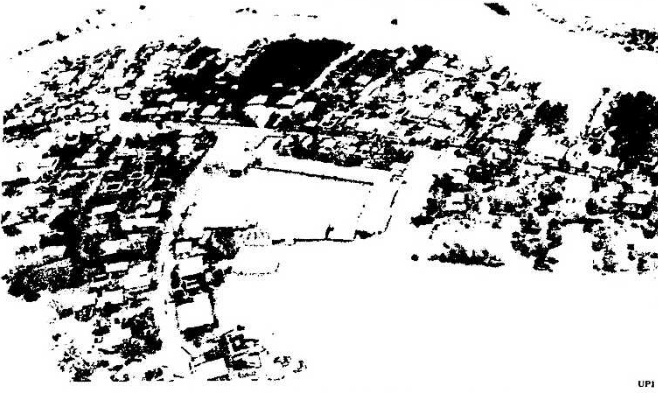
Aerial view of flooded section of Pampanga Province on an unknown date.

With the addition of six from the existing casualty toll, the deaths from Olga's flooding rose to 53 as of the next day, May 25. In addition, Arnedo Dike, a major flood control reservoir in Pampanga also overflowed due to the system's rains. The AFP ordered the evacuation of 50,000 persons living near the foot of the said basin while a flood control station, located 40 miles to the north of Manila recorded rising two-feet floodwaters. The country's defense home center in Pampanga appealed for US water-resistant vehicles from Clark Air Base and helicopters for rescuing and evacuating stranded residents. Furthermore, they also aided in food rescue operations in many flooded areas. The municipality of La Paz in Tarlac has an estimated 10,000 people stuck in their flooded areas, according to news reports there. According to the state-owned Philippine News Agency, on that day over 10,000 families or 70,000 individuals were affected by the burst of the dike and the number of evacuated people rapidly ascended to over 139,500 as of that day. Late news reports from the country indicated that Marcos announced the state of calamity on Luzon via nationwide radio; many goods are under price freeze including candles, matches, canned goods, fish and instant coffee. Over 15,000 acres of rice lands ready for harvesting were wasted due to Olga.

=== May 26 ===
The number of people who evacuated during the reservoir burst climbed to 80,000 on May 26. Two more waterbodies overflowed on the country due to Olga; the Santo Tomas and Santa Cruz dikes. The former destroyed 400 houses and killed eight in its path. The death toll further rose to 109 with most of them due to drowning. Over 115,588 families or 602,000 persons were also in need of help due to the storm's aftermath. The estimated damages from the typhoon were set at $70 million, according to Marcos during an emergency meeting on that day with his cabinet members. 66 towns and 4 cities in the country were flooded while 14 bridges were washed away. Damages to public infrastructures were incurred at $3.6 million. Meanwhile, combined agricultural and property damages were set at $14 million. Rice stock at the disaster was announced to be at 1.8 million tons. More than 204,000 people lost their homes as a result. Hundreds of residents who refused to evacuate climbed and perched nearby trees and rooftops for their safety, news reports there indicated. Along with UPI photographer Willy Vicoy, Philippine helicopters rescued 127 persons in Arayat, a municipality in Pampanga. A bridge in the area also collapsed, killing four due to drowning. Flood readings in the Pampanga River indicated an “all-time high” of 17.85 feet on that day also, beating the 17.5 feet record held by the same basin in a disastrous flood in July and August 1972.

40-80% of the sets at Iba, Zambales from the production of the 1979 American epic psychological war film Apocalypse Now were also wrecked due to strong winds from Olga. Its stranded crew were confined in a hotel, while others stayed in small houses. The Playboy Playmate set had also been destroyed, ruining a month's worth of production schedule.

=== May 27 ===
112 individuals were further reported dead and 12 missing on May 27. Destroyed bridges caused by flooding disrupted aid to over 600,000 people affected by the storm. American and Filipino helicopters continue to rescue people that are still stranded off their roofs. Meanwhile, 1 dam, 10 dikes, 20 bridges, and 92 areas in the Philippines were affected, destroyed, or sustained damages due to Olga. The MacArthur Highway was reported to have been cut due to floods. As a response to the appeal from the Philippine government, the U.S. government sent Navy and Air Force helicopters to assist the existing rescue operations. Despite Olga now in the South China Sea, it influenced the southwest monsoon with its “tail” causing another round of downpour in downtown Manila. It caused heavy traffic in and out of the capital while vehicles were also stranded due to numerous landslides in Baguio. The Santo Tomas Dam, a reservoir that overflowed on May 26 killed 82 in Batangas, late reports indicated. 20 passengers in a bus were also swept away into their deaths, according to a radio report from the government of Bicol Region where the accident happened. Despite these, businesses in Manila were opened after five days of closure while several thousands of passenger ferries and vessels were still in shelters and stranded in Mindoro Island, in which most of them were bound to the capital.

=== May 28 ===
"The floodwaters are receding very, very slowly. It may take four or five days before the floods recede.”

— A spokesperson from the National Disaster Control Center (NDCC)

185 people were killed and over 800,000 were rendered homeless as of May 28. 10 of the latest casualty toll is from Nueva Ecija, which are all students, where they are buried alive by a landslide. The Philippine Red Cross called this “the extent of human suffering and destruction” due to Olga's swath of damages. President Marcos will take an aerial survey on an unknown date in Central Luzon, according to Associated Press. Despite Olga dissipating as it was absorbed by a subtropical disturbance at this day, heavy rains occurred in Pangasinan; these are attributed to the storm.

=== May 29 ===
"Landslides have cut off villages. Roads and bridges are destroyed. You cannot go any place by road. For miles and miles there is only water and that’s all. In one town north of Manila, Calumpit, the water is still up to the roof of the school”

— Jean Michel Goudstekker, a French representative from the League of Red Cross Societies (LRCS) as she conducted a helicopter aerial tour of Central Luzon

On May 29, at least 1,000 persons or over 100 vehicles were trapped in Dalton Pass in the Caraballo Mountains; military helicopters were trying to reach the area but were unsuccessful due to bad weather. 1.3 million people were also forced to leave their homes according to agencies in the area. A total of 72 flights have been already conducted by the aircraft of the U.S. Navy Force, the U.S. Navy said from Subic Bay, according to Associated Press. The Philippine Red Cross also noted that Japan, Canada, Finland, Great Britain, Australia, and New Zealand had responded to the appeal they made for help, either receiving cash or relief goods as a donation. More contributions came from the United States, Norway, and West Germany as the day ended; the former had the biggest in the countries listed below, with over $500,000 worth of donations for relief operations by the two American military bases in the country. The PRC, meanwhile published a casualty toll of 188 that day. The individuals who lost their homes were currently living in various schools, town halls, and churches, according to the organization. inundations were reported to have been receding starting that day, and the weather bureau urged people to resume their normal activities today. Marcos also finished his tour on the severely affected areas in Luzon on May 28. He also ordered a large shift from rescue operations to relief and rehabilitation routines to make the transmission of goods in the affected areas. In addition, the President also announced the cancellation of a grand parade and traditional reception that was supposed to be held on June 12, the country's independence day due to the reason that “there’s nothing to be happy about”.

=== May 31 ===
The death toll further rose to 203 on May 31, according to the latest tally of the PRC at that day, including 5 individuals whose died of starvation due to them being trapped in a mountain pass isolated by landslides. Sixteen choppers from the Philippine and U.S. Navy rescued all the 1,000 people whose isolated over the Dalton Pass; several motorists are still stranded over the Cagayan Valley highway stretch due to destroyed and faded roads. 67 individuals meanwhile were arrested with charges of profiteering and hoarding of food packs. The Philippine President also announced the one-week cancelation of school year that was supposed to start on June 7.

== Aftermath and retirement ==
After May 1976, eight more people were found dead, with 7 of them being buried in a landslide, increasing Olga's death toll to 211.

The official death toll for the system is published at 374, according to the figure released by PAGASA. However, the USAID and the JTWC only agreed at the number of over 200. Later, the weather bureau retired the Philippine name Didang and was replaced with Ditang for future seasons, beginning in 1980.

== See also ==
- 1976 Pacific typhoon season
- Typhoon Rita (1972)
