= List of storms named Kim =

The name Kim has been used for several tropical cyclones in the northwest Pacific Ocean.

- Severe Tropical Storm Kim (1965) (T6516, 19W) – strong tropical storm which stayed offshore Japan
- Typhoon Kim (1968) (T6802, 03W, Biring) - relatively strong typhoon which recurved at sea.
- Tropical Storm Kim (1971) (T7115, 14W, Oniang) – affected the Philippines and Vietnam
- Severe Tropical Storm Kim (1974) (T7412, 13W) – strong tropical storm which did not affect any landmass
- Typhoon Kim (1977) (T7719, 19W, Unding) – late-season typhoon which struck the Philippines, killing 102
- Typhoon Kim (1980) (T8009, 11W, Osang) – struck the Philippines and south China, claiming 41 lives
- Tropical Storm Kim (1983) (T8315, 16W, Rosing) – struck Vietnam and Thailand, reportedly causing more than 300 fatalities
- Typhoon Kim (1986) (T8626, 23W, Yaning) – late-season strong typhoon which did not affect land areas

The name Kim has also been used for tropical cyclones in the South Pacific Ocean.

- Tropical Cyclone Kim (1975) – lingered over the Northern Territory and Far North Queensland in early-December 1975
- Severe Tropical Cyclone Kim (2000) – strong tropical cyclone which only caused minor damage in French Polynesia in late-February 2000

== See also ==
- Cyclone Kimi (2021), similarly-named tropical cyclone in the Australian region which affected eastern Queensland
