= List of storms named Paring =

The name Paring was used for ten tropical cyclones by the Philippine Atmospheric, Geophysical and Astronomical Services Administration (PAGASA) and its predecessor, the Philippine Weather Bureau, in the Western Pacific Ocean.

- Tropical Storm Grace (1964) (T6410, 13W, Osang–Paring) – tropical storm that did not make landfall.
- Typhoon Judy (1968) (26W, Paring)– a Category 4 typhoon that did not affect land.
- Typhoon Helen (1972) (T7220, 20W, Paring) – the most destructive tropical cyclone to strike Japan during the 1972.
- Tropical Storm Ellen (1976) (T7616, 16W, Paring) – a weak tropical storm that made landfall Northern Philippines and Hong Kong.
- Tropical Depression 14W (1980) (14W Paring) – a tropical depression that affected Philippines, South China and Vietnam.
- Tropical Depression Paring (1984) – a weak tropical depression that persisted near the Philippines.
- Typhoon Nelson (1988) – a Category 5 super typhoon that did not affect any land.
- Tropical Storm Colleen (1992) – a severe tropical storm intensified over the South China Sea before making landfall in Vietnam.
- Typhoon Zane (1996) – a Category 3 equivalent typhoon that crossed the Ryukyu Islands.
- Typhoon Yagi (2000) – a Category 3 typhoon executed a cyclonic loop near the Ryukyu Islands dissipated near Taiwan.

After the 2000 Pacific typhoon season, the PAGASA revised their naming lists, and the name Paring was excluded.

Preceded by Osang	Pacific typhoon season names Paring	Succeeded by Reming
