= List of storms named Maring =

The name Maring has been used for 16 tropical cyclones in the Philippine Area of Responsibility in the West Pacific Ocean:

- Tropical Depression Maring (1964) (11W)
- Typhoon Della (1968) (T6816, 20W, Maring) – a Category 4-equivalent typhoon that caused significant damage on Miyako Island. Also called the 3rd Miyakojima Typhoon (ja:第3宮古島台風) in Japan.
- Typhoon Betty (1972) (T7214, 14W, Maring) – a Category 4-equivalent super typhoon that stranded approximately 300,000 people in Sanchong District and killed 29 people across the Philippines and Taiwan.
- Typhoon Anita (1976) (T7612, 12W, Maring) – a Category 1-equivalent typhoon that affected Japan.
- Tropical Depression Maring (1980) (10W) – made landfall in China.
- Typhoon June (1984) (T8412, 14W, Maring) – caused over 100 fatalities in the Philippines days before Typhoon Ike.
- Tropical Storm Kit (1988) (T8821, 17W, Maring) – a severe tropical storm that inundated over 100,000 acres (approximately 40,000 hectares) of farmland in China.
- Tropical Storm Ted (1992) (T9219, 19W, Maring) – a severe tropical storm that affected the Philippines, Taiwan, China, and South Korea, causing over 60 fatalities.
- Typhoon Sally (1996) (T9616, 23W, Maring) – a Category 5-equivalent super typhoon that caused over 100 fatalities in China.
- Typhoon Wukong (2000) (T0016, 23W, Maring) – a Category 2-equivalent typhoon that made landfall on Hainan and Vietnam.
- Typhoon Haiyan (2001) (T0121, 25W, Maring) – a Category 2-equivalent typhoon that affected Taiwan and Japan.
- Typhoon Longwang (2005) (T0519, 19W, Maring) – a Category 4-equivalent typhoon that caused record-breaking winds in Hualien City and killed over 100 people in China.
- Tropical Storm Mujigae (2009) (T0913, 14W, Maring) – affected the Philippines and made landfall on Hainan and in Vietnam.
- Tropical Storm Trami (2013) (T1312, 12W, Maring) – a severe tropical storm that enhanced the southwest monsoon in the Philippines.
- Typhoon Doksuri (2017) (T1719, 21W, Maring) – a Category 2-equivalent typhoon that killed 22 people in the Philippines and became the fifth-costliest tropical cyclone to affect Vietnam.
- Tropical Storm Kompasu (2021) (T2118, 24W, Maring) – a severe tropical storm that caused billions of damages in pesos in the Philippines and heavy precipitation in China and Vietnam.

The name Maring was retired following the 2021 season, being replaced with Mirasol, which means sunflower in Tagalog.

Preceded by Lusing	Pacific typhoon season names Maring	Succeeded by Ningning
