= List of storms named Utor =

The name Utor (Marshallese: uto̧r, [wudˠɒrʷ]) has been used for three tropical cyclones in the western North Pacific Ocean. The name was contributed by the United States and means squall line in Marshallese.

- Severe Tropical Storm Utor (2001) (T0104, 06W, Feria) – made landfall on the Dapeng Peninsula, China.
- Typhoon Utor (2006) (T0622, 25W, Seniang) – struck the Philippines.
- Typhoon Utor (2013) (T1311, 11W, Labuyo) – powerful typhoon that made landfall on Luzon, in the Philippines, and later in Guangdong, China.

The name Utor was retired following the 2013 Pacific typhoon season and was replaced with Barijat.
