= List of storms named Ningning =

The name Ningning has been used to name four tropical cyclones within the Philippine Area of Responsibility by the PAGASA. Ningning replaced Nitang after it was retired in 1984.

- Tropical Storm Lee (1988) (T8822, 18W, Ningning) – had no significant effects on land.
- Typhoon Yvette (1992) (T9223, 22W, Ningning) – a Category 5 super typhoon that curved away from the Philippines.
- Tropical Depression 24W (1996) (24W, Ningning) – struck the Philippines and dissipated offshore Vietnam.
- Tropical Storm Bopha (2000) (T0015, 24W, Ningning) – brushed Luzon.

After the 2000 Pacific typhoon season, the PAGASA revised their naming lists, and the name Ningning was excluded.

Preceded by Maring	Pacific typhoon season names Ningning	Succeeded by Osang
