= Typhoon Percy (1990) =

Pacific typhoon in 1990

Typhoon Percy (Klaring)
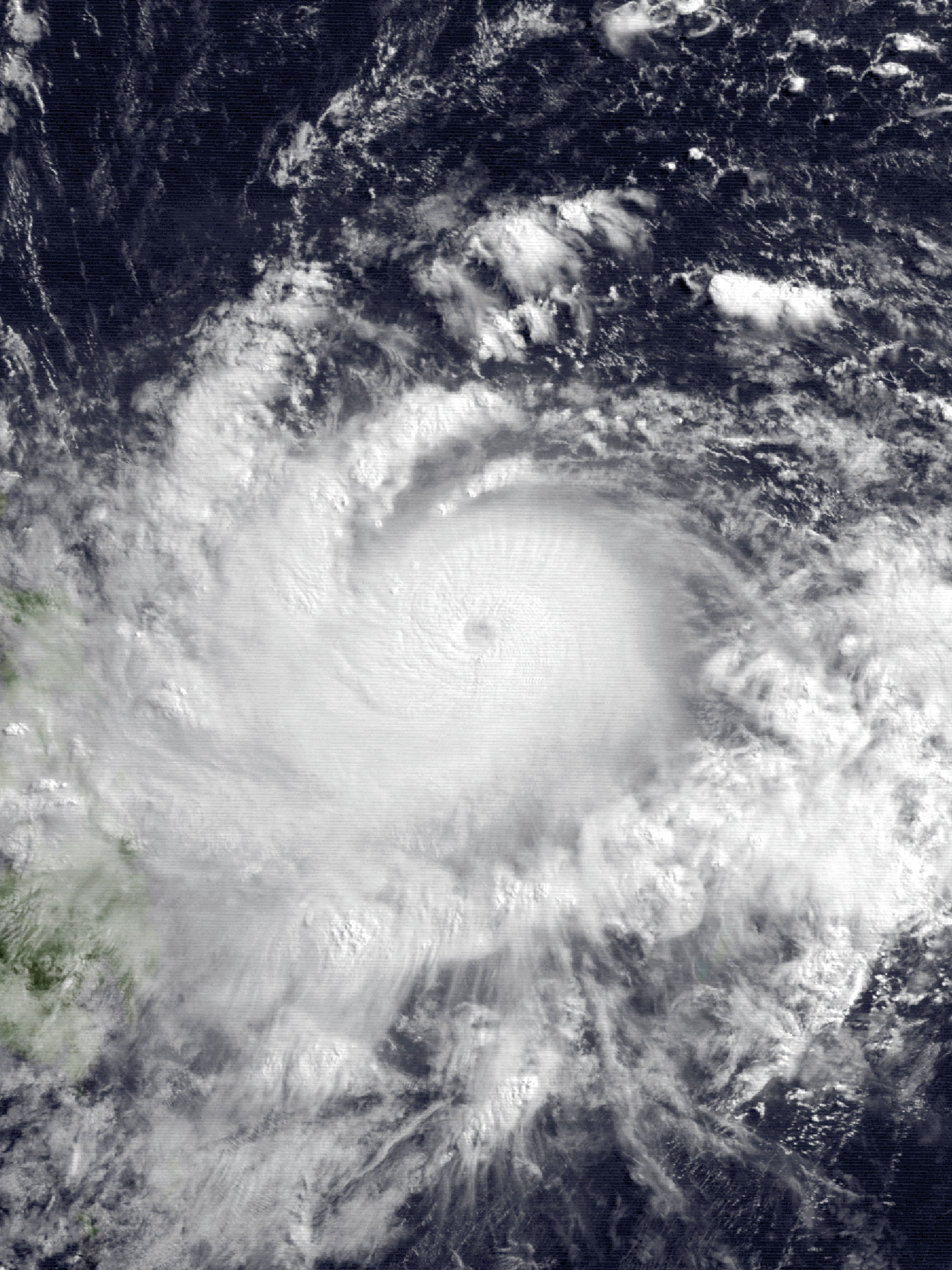
- Typhoon Percy on June 25

Meteorological history
- Formed: June 20, 1990
- Dissipated: June 30, 1990

Typhoon
- 10-minute sustained (JMA)
- Highest winds: 150 km/h (90 mph)
- Lowest pressure: 950 hPa (mbar); 28.05 inHg

Category 4-equivalent typhoon
- 1-minute sustained (SSHWS/JTWC)
- Highest winds: 215 km/h (130 mph)
- Lowest pressure: 927 hPa (mbar); 27.37 inHg

Overall effects
- Fatalities: 27 total
- Damage: $426 million (1990 USD)
- Areas affected: Caroline Islands, Philippines, Taiwan, south China
- Part of the 1990 Pacific typhoon season

Typhoon Percy, known in the Philippines as Typhoon Klaring, was the third tropical cyclone to affect the country in 1990. The fourth and the last tropical cyclone to be formed in June of the 1990 Pacific typhoon season, Typhoon Percy originated from an area of disturbed weather spawned by the Western Pacific monsoon trough on June 20. That same day, the disturbance was classified as a tropical depression as it slowly organized and on June 21, the depression obtained tropical storm intensity. After initially tracking westward, Percy turned towards the southwest while slowly deepening. During this time, Percy affected several of the Carolina Islands. Thirty homes were damaged and airline services were halted in and out of Yap. Farther south-southwest, seven homes were destroyed on the Ngulu Atoll. Furthermore, one boy was killed on Koror, where numerous homes lost their roofs and communication lines were downed. Percy then turned back to the west-northwest and became a typhoon on June 23. It then began to deepen at a faster rate, with Percy attaining its maximum intensity of 145 km/h (90 mph) on June 25. Two days later, on June 27, increased wind shear began to induce a weakening trend and the typhoon brushed Luzon, where eight people were killed and over 30,000 lost their homes. Despite that however, damages in the country was minor.

After tracking through the South China Sea, Percy made landfall southwest of Xiamen on June 29, and on the next day, dissipated inland. In the province of Quanzhou, four people were killed while 100,000 trees were damaged along with 1,000 power lines. One person was killed in Zhangzhou. In Dongshan, one individual died, four others suffered injuries, and a third of the trees were downed. Moreover, in the province of Shantou, 95 structures were destroyed and 201 were damaged. A total of 16 people were killed throughout southeastern China and more than 100 others sustained injuries. Damage was estimated at US$28 million (¥190 million).

== Meteorological history ==
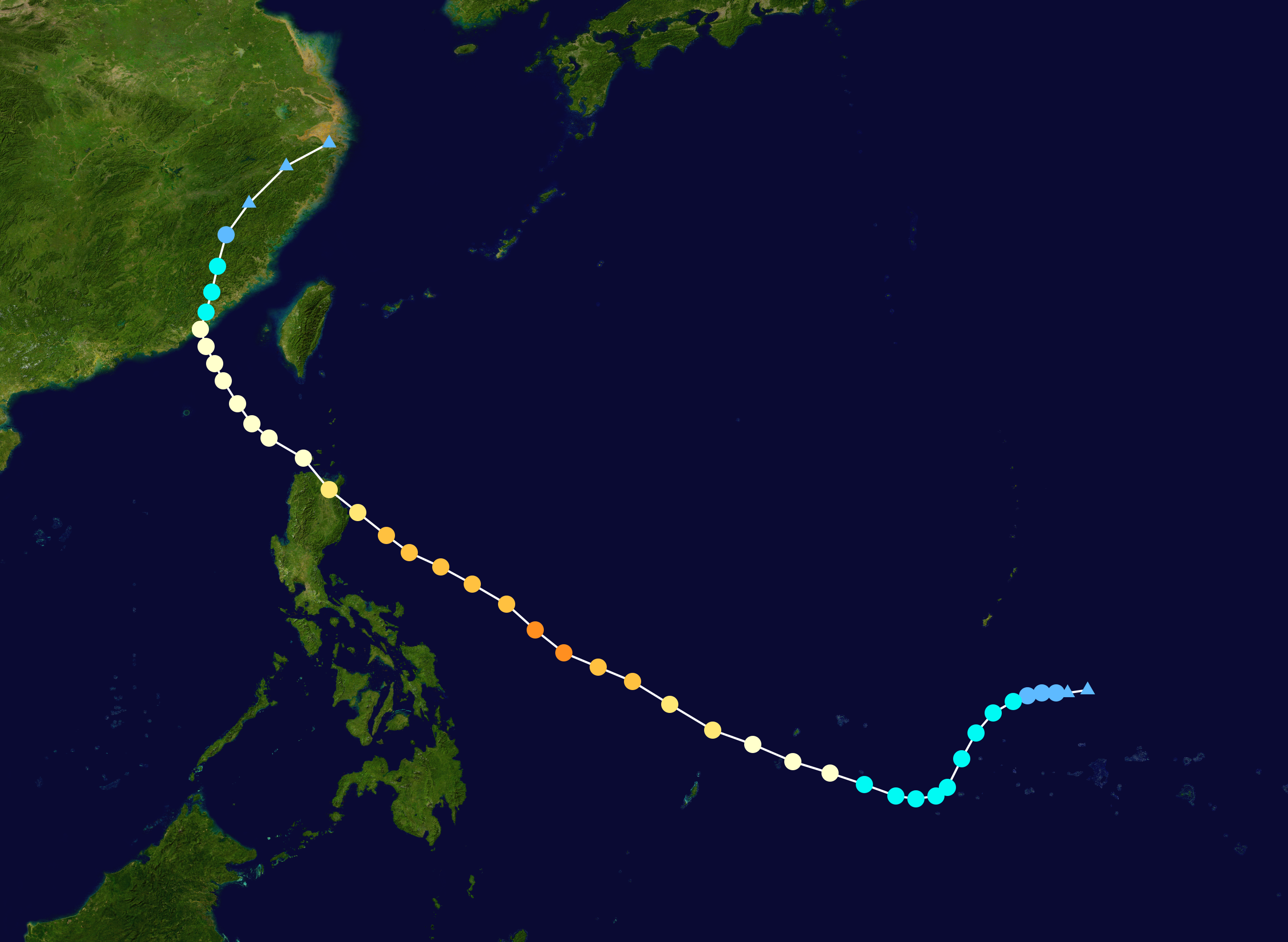
Map plotting the storm's track and intensity, according to the Saffir–Simpson scale Map key Saffir–Simpson scale Tropical depression (≤38 mph, ≤62 km/h) Tropical storm (39–73 mph, 63–118 km/h) Category 1 (74–95 mph, 119–153 km/h) Category 2 (96–110 mph, 154–177 km/h) Category 3 (111–129 mph, 178–208 km/h) Category 4 (130–156 mph, 209–251 km/h) Category 5 (≥157 mph, ≥252 km/h) Unknown Storm type Tropical cyclone Subtropical cyclone Extratropical cyclone, remnant low, tropical disturbance, or monsoon depression

Typhoon Percy originated from the eastern end of the Western Pacific monsoon trough that spawned an area of disturbed weather that was first noted by the Joint Typhoon Warning Center (JTWC) on the morning of June 20. Satellite imagery showed signs of a well-defined low-level circulation and the disturbance was situated in a weakly divergent environment aloft along with persistent convection. On the same day, the Japan Meteorological Agency (JMA) upgraded the system into a tropical depression. (Note: The Japan Meteorological Agency is the official Regional Specialized Meteorological Center for the western Pacific Ocean.) The system gradually became more organized as its outflow expanded, and following a marked increase in convection, the JTWC issued a Tropical Cyclone Formation Alert on the system at 03:00 UTC on June 21. Following a ship report of 65 km/h (40 mph) winds, both the JTWC and JMA upgraded the system into Tropical Storm Percy. (Note: Wind estimates from the JMA and most other basins throughout the world are sustained over 10 minutes, while estimates from the United States-based Joint Typhoon Warning Center are sustained over 1 minute. 10-minute winds are about 1.14 times the amount of 1-minute winds.) After initially tracking westward, Percy turned and tracked southwestward for 36 hours, a move predicted by tropical cyclone forecast models but not foreseen by the JTWC. Meanwhile, the storm slowly intensified, aided by the development of an anticyclone caused aloft. As Percy continued to intensify, Percy began to track west-northwestward around another upper-level anticyclone that was formed in the southeast of Typhoon Ofelia which would later merge with a subtropical ridge to its north. By June 22, Percy was upgraded into a severe tropical storm by the JMA. Following the development of an outflow channel to its south, hints of an eye became visible on satellite imagery. Based on a Dvorak classification of T4.0/120 km/h (75 mph), the JTWC upgraded Percy into a typhoon on the evening of June 23, with the JMA subsequently following suit in the morning of June 24.

After moving away from the Caroline Islands, the typhoon began to intensify at a faster clip as an outflow channel to its north opened, even though the eye was initially ragged. On the evening of June 24, the JTWC raised the intensity of the system to 200 km/h (125 mph). Early on the next day, the JTWC estimated that Percy obtained its peak intensity based on the Dvorak estimate of T6.0/210 km/h (130 mph) and a clear eye. Meanwhile, the JMA reported that Percy attained its maximum intensity of 145 km/h (90 mph) and a minimum barometric pressure of 960 mbar (28.3 inHg). Increased vertical wind shear took toll on the storm, and by June 27, the JTWC dropped the intensity of the storm to 175 km/h (110 mph) as the storm passed over northeastern Luzon. Overland, the storm weakened slightly, but remained a typhoon upon entering the South China Sea. Both computer models and the JTWC expected Percy to begin recurvature; however, the subtropical ridge did not weaken as expected and Percy continued west-northwest instead. At 00:00 UTC on June 29, the JMA downgraded Percy to a severe tropical storm, although the JTWC suggested that Percy was still a typhoon at the time. Shortly thereafter, Percy moved onshore around 130 km (80 mi) southwest of Xiamen. At 06:00 UTC, the JTWC downgraded Percy into a tropical storm, noting that the storm had become less organized. By June 30, both the JTWC and JMA had ceased tracking the system, which had dissipated inland.

== Impact ==
During its formative stages, Percy affected several of the Caroline Islands. The storm first passed about 75 km (45 mi) south of Sorol. The island of Pegelmol was nearly cut in half by the system by storm surge. Taro patches, coconut trees, and other crops were almost completely wiped out. Percy came within 100 km (60 mi) of Yap to the south-southwest, where gusts of up to 105 km/h (65 mph) were felt. There, widespread flooding was reported due to storm surge, with most roads on the island requiring closure and 30 homes being damaged. Airline services in and out Yap were halted. To the south-southwest of Yap, the island of Ngulu Atoll bore the brunt of the typhoon. Gusts of up to 130 km/h (80 mph) resulted in the destruction of all crops on the island. Furthermore, seven homes were demolished while many others only lost their roofs. However, there were no fatalities. The typhoon passed 230 km (145 mi) north of Koror, where a boy perished when he was swept by rain into mangrove trees near his home. Meanwhile, radio towers, power lines and television lines were downed as several houses lost their roofs.

Typhoon Percy was the third typhoon of 1990, and second within a week, after Typhoon Ofelia, to threaten the Philippines. In the province of La Union, landslides killed six people. In suburban Quezon City, police reported that a woman fell into a creek and drowned. The Philippine Red Cross indicated that a baby girl drowned and two other individuals were listed as missing in floods in the Ilocos Region. According to the social welfare department, 31,206 people in 6,143 families lost their homes. Overall, damage in the country was light.

The typhoon posed enough of a threat to Hong Kong to warrant a No 1. hurricane signal briefly, but it was dropped within 24 hours. Nevertheless, a pressure of 999.4 mbar (29.51 inHg) was measured at the Hong Kong Royal Observatory early on June 29. Waglan Island recorded a mean hourly wind of 31 km/h (19 mph), with a gust of 45 km/h (28 mph). High Island received 245 mm (9.6 in) of rain during the passage of the storm, the highest in the region, 193 mm (7.6 in) fell in a 24-hour period. These rains resulted in flooding, especially in the New Territories, where there was slight damage to crops. In Kwai Chung, floodwaters were 0.6 m (2.0 ft) deep, sweeping away a ten-year-old boy. Two other villages lost power and eleven people had to be evacuated.

In the provinces of Fujian and Guangdong of China, power lines were downed. Farm production was reduced by 400 million catties in Fujian. In Nan'ao, gales persisted for about 10 hours and more than 410 mm (15 in) of rainfall was recorded, the heaviest in 300 years. Floodwaters there were up to 2 m (6.6 ft) deep. In Quanzhou, four people were killed, another was injured, and 100,000 ha (250,000 acres) of crops were damaged. There, 100,000 trees were damaged along with 1,000 power lines. One person was killed and tens of millions in damage was reported in Zhangzhou. In Dongshan, one individual died and four others suffered injuries. A total of 30,000 ha (74,000 acres) of asparagus were damaged. One vessel was sunk and seven more were damaged. One third of the trees there were downed. Damage in Dongshan was estimated at ¥27 million (US$5.7 million). (Note: Currencies can be converted to United States Dollars using (New People's Currency) Yuan Measuring worth with an exchange rate of the year 1990.) Elsewhere, 270,000 ha (670,000 acres) of farmland was flooded, including 174,000 ha (430,000 acres) of rice in Shantou. Ninety-five structures were destroyed and two hundred and one were damaged. Roughly 20 km (12 mi) of a highway was destroyed. Damage totaled ¥49 million (US$10 million). Overall, greater than 6,650 homes were damaged and numerous fishing boats sunk. Sixteen people were killed throughout southeastern China and more than 100 others sustained injuries. Damage was estimated at US$28 million.

The remnants of Percy would interact with a frontal low and stagnate along the Korea Strait, causing heavy rainfall in Japan on July 2. As a result of this, flooding was recorded in many parts of Saga Prefecture. This flooding event caused fifteen buildings to be partially destroyed, over 250 roads to be damaged in some way, seventeen levee collapses, four bridges to be washed away, five injuries, and two deaths in the prefecture. In total, in Saga Prefecture, Percy's remnants caused 57.976 billion yen (USD397.65 million) in damage.

== See also ==
- Typhoon Kim (1980)
