= Typhoon Eli =

Pacific typhoon in 1992

Typhoon Eli (Konsing)
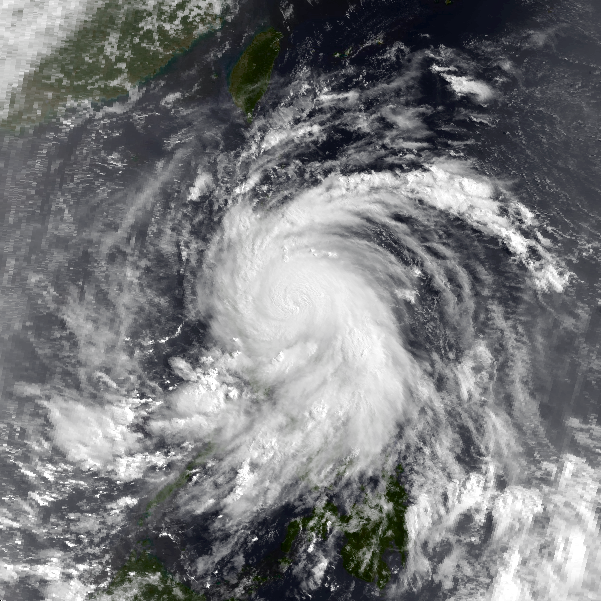
- Typhoon Eli late on July 10

Meteorological history
- Formed: July 8, 1992
- Dissipated: July 14, 1992

Typhoon
- 10-minute sustained (JMA)
- Highest winds: 130 km/h (80 mph)
- Lowest pressure: 965 hPa (mbar); 28.50 inHg

Category 1-equivalent tropical cyclone
- 1-minute sustained (SSHWS/JTWC)
- Highest winds: 140 km/h (85 mph)
- Lowest pressure: 967 hPa (mbar); 28.56 inHg

Overall effects
- Fatalities: 4 total
- Damage: $273 million (1992 USD)
- Areas affected: Philippines; Hainan
- Part of the 1992 Pacific typhoon season

Typhoon Eli, known in the Philippines as Typhoon Konsing, struck the Philippines and Hainan during mid-July 1992. A weak low pressure system developed in the Philippine Sea on July 7, which became a tropical depression on the next day. The depression tracked west-northwest and strengthened into a tropical storm on July 10. After turning more westward, Eli steadily intensified, and obtained typhoon intensity that evening. The storm attained its highest intensity of 130 km/h (80 mph) early on July 11 before striking northern Luzon. After entering the South China Sea, the storm maintained most of its intensity as it approached Hainan, although agencies disagree on how precisely strong it was. After passing through Hainan late on July 13, Eli passed through the Gulf of Tonkin on the next day before striking Vietnam, where Eli quickly dissipated.

Heavy rains associated with Typhoon Eli deluged Luzon and resulted in mudslides surrounding Mount Pinatubo, which had erupted a year prior. Offshore, 10 ships sunk, resulting in a fatality, 19 rescues, and initial reports of 25 missing fishermen. Monetary damage was estimated at US$862,000 (₱22 million). (Note: All currencies are converted to United States Dollars using Philippines Measuring worth with an exchange rate of the year 1992.) (Note: All damage totals are in 1992 values of their respective currencies.) Fifteen homes were damaged and five were destroyed. A total of 1,027 families were evacuated from their homes. Throughout the country, four people were killed. Across Hong Kong, 23 people were injured. Farther south, Eli caused widespread damage in northern Hainan, though there were no deaths and only one serious injury. Around 670 hectares (1,700 acres) of shrimp farms were flooded. High winds damaged 1,000 hectares (2,500 acres) of pepper trees and 800 hectares (2,000 acres) of coconut trees. Total economic loss in Hainan was estimated at US$272 million (¥1.5 billion). (Note: All currencies are converted to United States Dollars using (New People's Currency) Yuan Measuring worth with an exchange rate of the year 1992.)

== Meteorological history ==
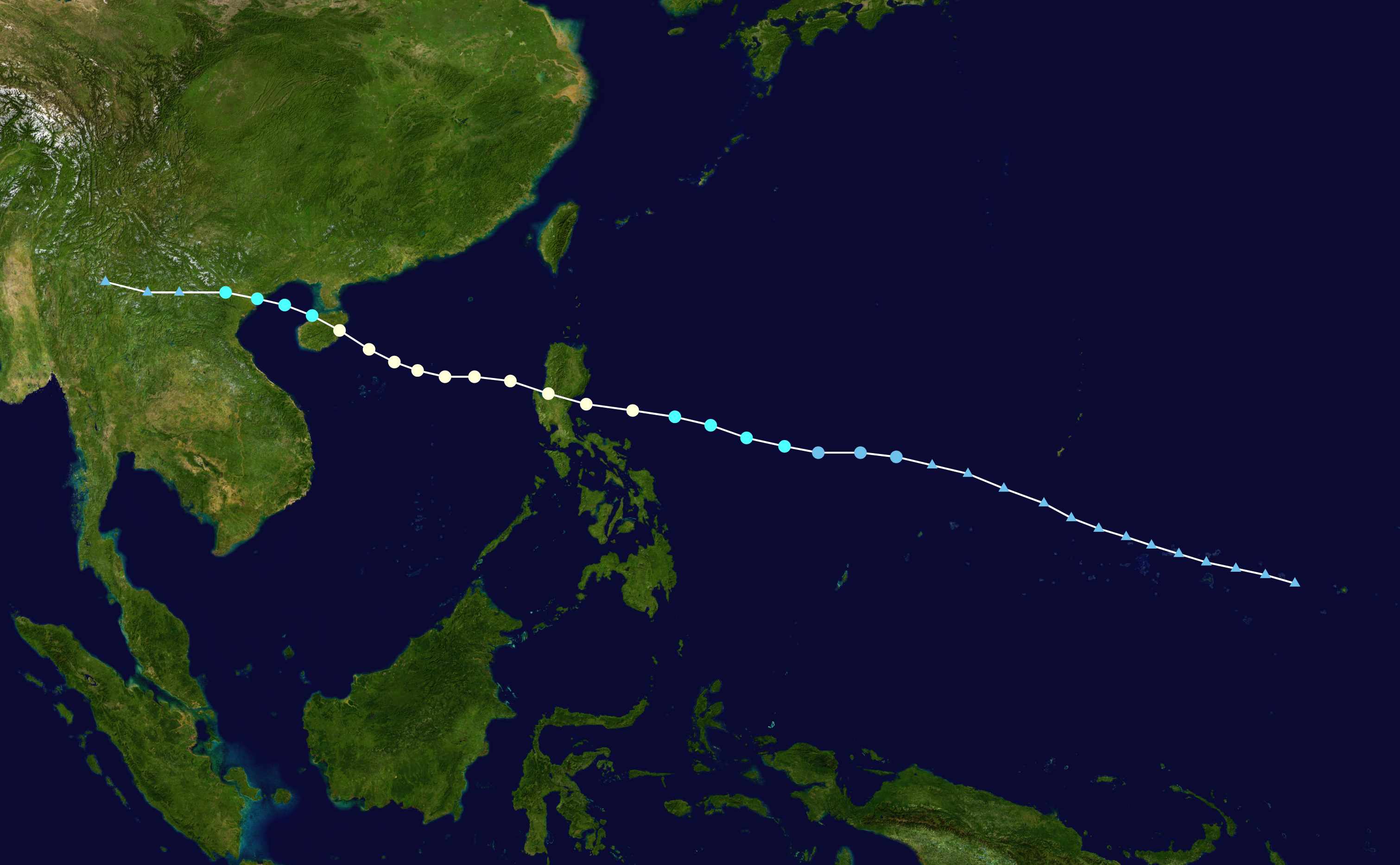
Map plotting the storm's track and intensity, according to the Saffir–Simpson scale Map key Saffir–Simpson scale Tropical depression (≤38 mph, ≤62 km/h) Tropical storm (39–73 mph, 63–118 km/h) Category 1 (74–95 mph, 119–153 km/h) Category 2 (96–110 mph, 154–177 km/h) Category 3 (111–129 mph, 178–208 km/h) Category 4 (130–156 mph, 209–251 km/h) Category 5 (≥157 mph, ≥252 km/h) Unknown Storm type Tropical cyclone Subtropical cyclone Extratropical cyclone, remnant low, tropical disturbance, or monsoon depression

Following the recurvature of Tropical Depression Deanna on July 2, 1992, ridging temporarily replaced the monsoon trough across the Philippine Islands and the Philippine Sea. This prompted weak winds out of the southwest to persist at low latitudes, which eventually spawned a weak low pressure area that was first noted by the Joint Typhoon Warning Center (JTWC) on the morning of July 7. On the next day, the Japan Meteorological Agency (JMA) first classified the system as a tropical depression. (Note: The Japan Meteorological Agency is the official Regional Specialized Meteorological Center for the western Pacific Ocean.) After tracking to the south of Guam, the disturbance accelerated west-northwest and increased in organization, prompting JTWC to issue a Tropical Cyclone Formation Alert at 11:02 UTC on July 9. An increase in convective coverage then led the JTWC to declare the system a tropical depression seven hours later. The depression was upgraded to a tropical storm at 00:00 UTC on July 10 by both the JMA and JTWC as Eli's convective buildup continued. (Note: Wind estimates from the JMA and most other basins throughout the world are sustained over 10 minutes, while estimates from the United States-based Joint Typhoon Warning Center are sustained over 1 minute. 10-minute winds are about 1.14 times the amount of 1-minute winds.)

The intensification trend persisted as the storm tracked more westward; the JMA declared Eli a severe tropical storm at 06:00 UTC the same day. Twelve hours later, the JTWC estimated at Eli attained typhoon intensity. At 00:00 UTC on July 11, the JMA upgraded Eli into a typhoon, with the JTWC and JMA also analyzing a peak intensity of 135 and 130 km/h (85 and 80 mph) respectively at the same time. Shortly thereafter, the typhoon made landfall on northern Luzon. After entering the South China Sea, the typhoon tracked west as its forward motion slowed in response to Eli nearing the western end of a subtropical ridge. Now tracking west-northwest, data from the JTWC suggested that Eli maintained minimal typhoon intensity until it moved through Hainan on the night of July 13, though data from the JMA indicated that Eli was a weakening tropical storm during this time. The JTWC downgraded Eli into a tropical storm while the system moved west-northwestward across the Gulf of Tonkin. Eli made landfall late on July 13 about 160 km (100 mi) east of Hanoi, with the JMA estimating winds of 80 km/h (50 mph). Eli dissipated over northern Vietnam on July 14.

== Impact ==
The precursor disturbance to Eli dropped .5 in (13 mm) of rain to Guam but there was no damage. Due to the impending threat of Eli, authorities raised typhoon alerts over wide areas of the southern Bicol region and across Luzon. Sixty buses in six town were set up in order to evacuate residents from vulnerable locations. Officials evacuated 1,600 people from their homes in three central Luzon towns to escape avalanches of debris from Mount Pinatubo.

Torrential rains associated with Typhoon Eli alleviated drought conditions but also resulted in mudslides in the Mount Pinatubo area of Luzon, where there were reports of three deaths, including a 72-year-old man who died of a heart attack while being evacuated in Minalin. Offshore, 10 ships sunk, resulting in a fatality, 19 rescues, and initial reports of 25 missing fishermen. Monetary damage was estimated at US$862,000 (₱22 million), with around half from crops, and half from infrastructure. Fifteen homes were damaged and five were destroyed. A total of 1,027 families were evacuated from their homes. Throughout the country, four people were killed.

The typhoon posed enough of a threat to Hong Kong to warrant a No 1. hurricane signal on July 11, and this signal was upgraded to a No. 3 a day later before Eli moved away. The outer rainbands brought heavy rains, peaking at 55 mm (2.2 in) in Yuen Long, and strong winds to the area, with a gust of at 137 km/h (85 mph) occurring at Kai Tak Airport while Tai Mo Shan recorded a peak sustained wind of 76 km/h (47 mph). In Hong Kong one worker was injured when he was working on a boat in rough seas off Tsing Yi. Twenty-two passengers were hurt, including fourteen in Tuen Mun. Ferry services to China and Macau from Hong Kong were cancelled or suspended. Elsewhere, Eli caused widespread damage in northern Hainan, though there were no deaths. A farmer broke his legs in Wenchang due to a fallen coconut tree. Around 670 ha (1,655 acres) of shrimp farms were submerged. Strong winds damaged 1,000 ha (2,470 acres) of pepper trees and 800 ha (2,000 acres) of coconut trees. According to news reports, some houses collapsed and electricity cables were damaged while fish ponds were inundated. Total economic loss in Hainan was estimated at US$272 million (¥1.5 billion).

== See also ==
- Typhoon Kim (1980)
