= List of storms named Ditang =

The name Ditang has been used for six tropical cyclones in the Philippines by PAGASA in the Western Pacific Ocean. It replaced Didang, which was retired after a destructive typhoon in 1976.

- Typhoon Dom (1980) (T8002, 03W, Ditang) – a strong and long-lived early-season typhoon which affected the Philippines.
- Severe Tropical Storm Freda (1984) (T8408, 08W, Ditang) – a relatively strong tropical system which crossed Taiwan and Mainland China.
- Typhoon Thad (1988) (T8804, 04W, Ditang) – a minimal typhoon that paralleled the Philippine seaboard.
- Severe Tropical Storm Gary (1992) (T9207, 07W, Ditang) – a strong tropical storm which brought destructive impacts to the Philippines and China, claiming 48 lives.
- Tropical Storm Cam (1996) (T9604, 05W, Ditang) – an early-season tropical storm that only caused minimal damages after brushing Taiwan, northern Philippines and the Ryukyu Islands.
- Typhoon Kirogi (2000) (T0003, 05W, Ditang) – a powerful typhoon which brushed eastern Japan as a weaker system.

The name was not retired; however, Ditang was excluded when PAGASA released a new and updated version of the rotating four-year name lists in 2001.

== See also ==
- List of storms named Nitang – a similar name which was also used in the Western Pacific Ocean.
- Typhoon Dinang – another similar name which was also used in the Western Pacific Ocean.
