= Tropical Storm Trami (2013) =

Pacific severe tropical storm in 2013

Severe Tropical Storm Trami (Maring)
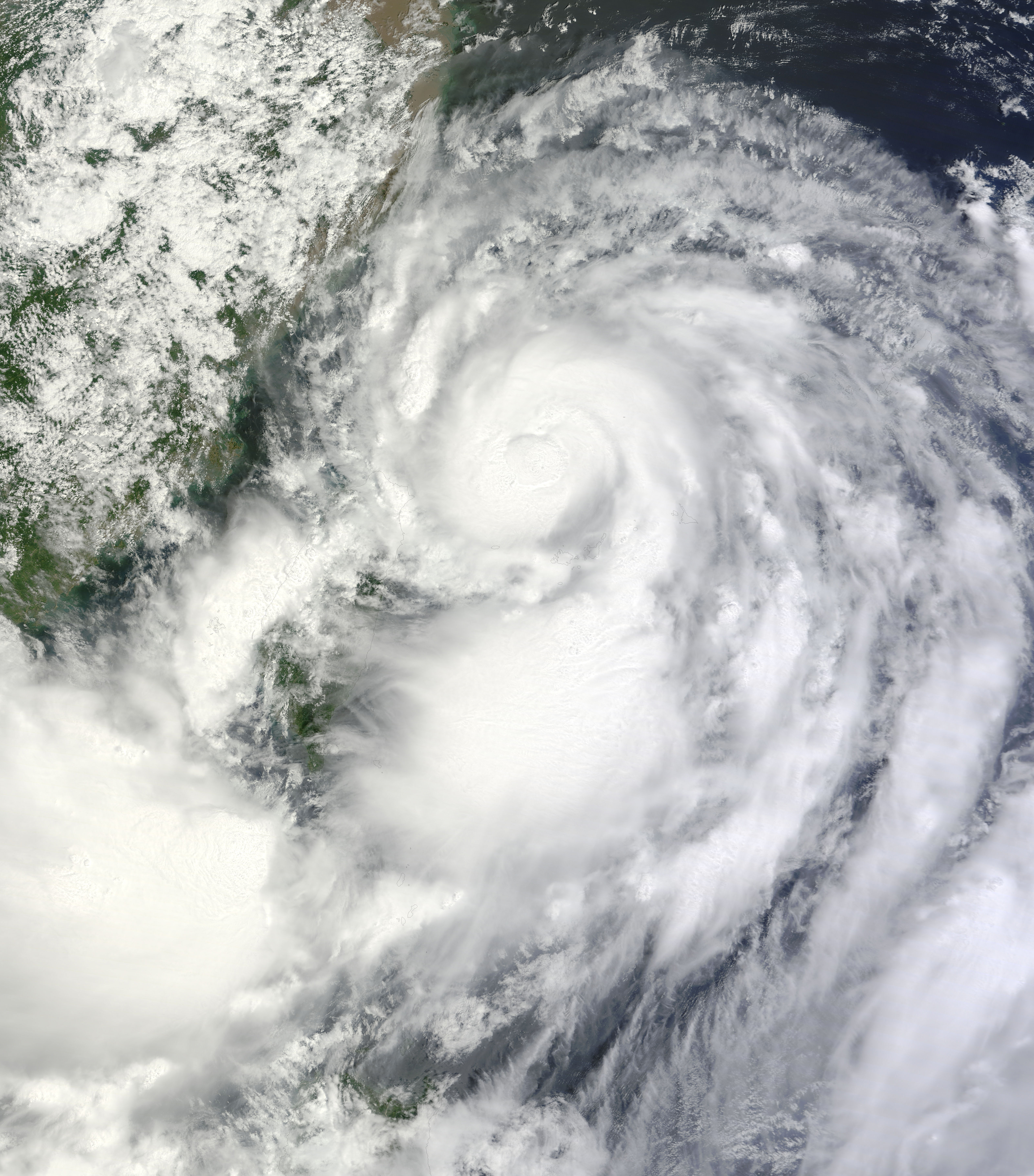
- Severe Tropical Storm Trami at peak intensity on August 21

Meteorological history
- Formed: August 16, 2013
- Dissipated: August 24, 2013

Severe tropical storm
- 10-minute sustained (JMA)
- Highest winds: 110 km/h (70 mph)
- Lowest pressure: 965 hPa (mbar); 28.50 inHg

Category 1-equivalent typhoon
- 1-minute sustained (SSHWS/JTWC)
- Highest winds: 140 km/h (85 mph)
- Lowest pressure: 967 hPa (mbar); 28.56 inHg

Overall effects
- Fatalities: 34 total
- Damage: $598 million (2013 USD)
- Areas affected: Philippines, Taiwan, China
- IBTrACS
- Part of the 2013 Pacific typhoon season

Severe Tropical Storm Trami, (Note: The name Trami (Vietnamese: trà mi, [t͡ɕaː˨˩ mi˧˧]) was contributed by Vietnam and means camellia in Vietnamese.) known in the Philippines as Severe Tropical Storm Maring, was a tropical cyclone that brought heavy rains to Taiwan and East China during mid-August 2013. Trami also made a fujiwhara interaction with Tropical Depression 13W north of it. The storm also enhanced the southwest monsoon causing more than 20 casualties in the Philippines.

== Meteorological history ==
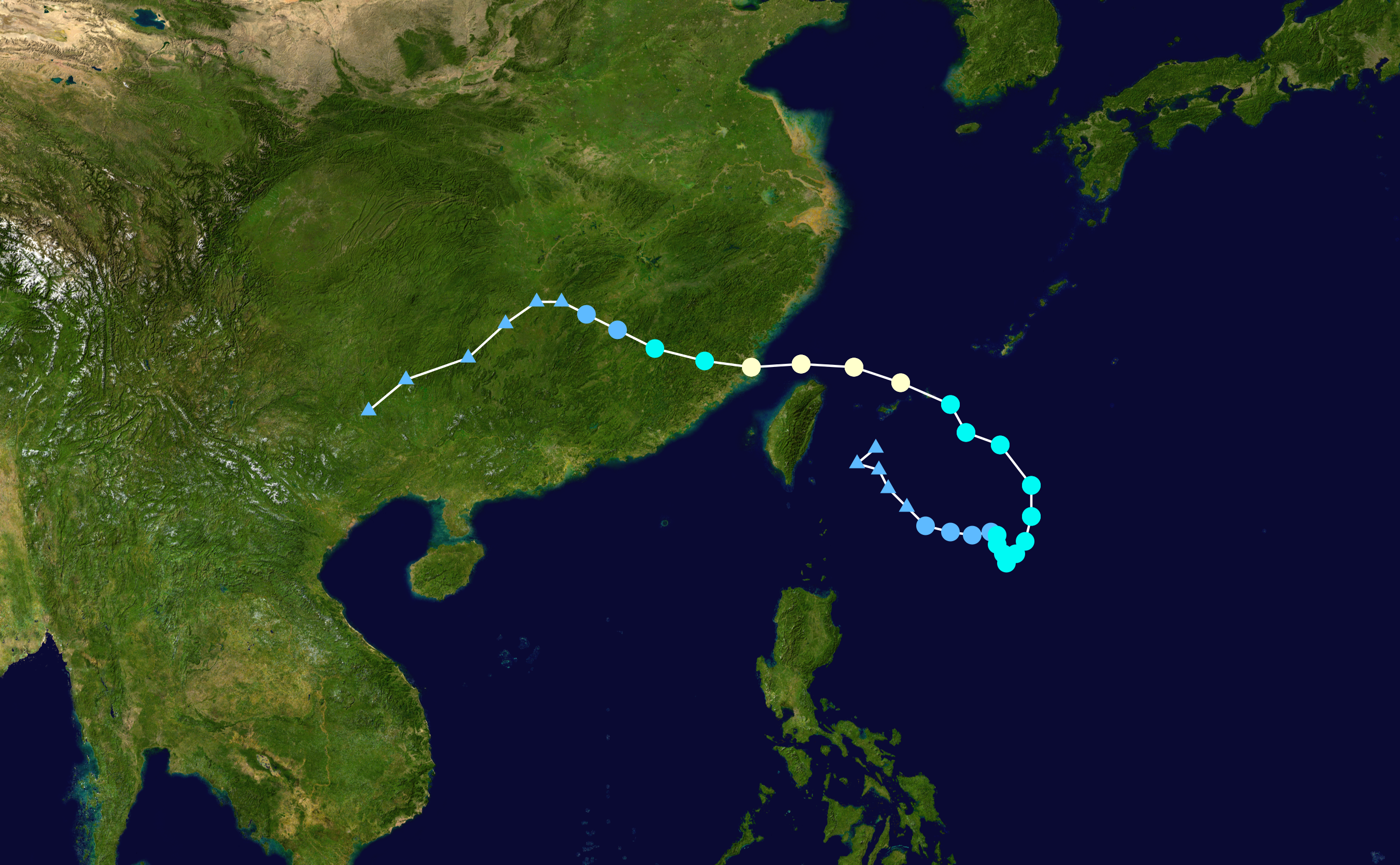
Map plotting the storm's track and intensity, according to the Saffir–Simpson scale Map key Saffir–Simpson scale Tropical depression (≤38 mph, ≤62 km/h) Tropical storm (39–73 mph, 63–118 km/h) Category 1 (74–95 mph, 119–153 km/h) Category 2 (96–110 mph, 154–177 km/h) Category 3 (111–129 mph, 178–208 km/h) Category 4 (130–156 mph, 209–251 km/h) Category 5 (≥157 mph, ≥252 km/h) Unknown Storm type Tropical cyclone Subtropical cyclone Extratropical cyclone, remnant low, tropical disturbance, or monsoon depression

During August 16, the Japan Meteorological Agency (JMA) started to monitor a tropical depression, that had developed from the outflow of Typhoon Utor, and within a marginal environment for further development about 340 kilometres (210 mi) to the southeast of Taipei, Taiwan. During that day the depressions low level circulation centre consolidated as the system moved towards the southeast, before it was named Maring by the Philippine Atmospheric, Geophysical and Astronomical Services Administration later that day. Early on August 17, as the system moved south-eastwards along the subtropical ridge of high pressure, the United States Joint Typhoon Warning Center (JTWC) initiated advisories on Maring and designated it as Tropical Depression 12W.

Maring began to interact with Tropical Depression 13W north of it and a small high-pressure in the middle of the two storms, exhibiting a Fujiwhara Effect. On August 18, 12W strengthened into a tropical storm, which JMA identified it as Trami, while steadily tracking generally eastwards.

On August 21, at 18:40 UTC, (02:40 CST, August 22), Trami made landfall on China's Fujian province as the JTWC issued their final advisory. Over the next couple of days the system passed through the Chinese provinces of Jiangxi and Hunan as it gradually weakened into a tropical depression. Trami was subsequently last noted by the JMA on August 24, as it dissipated over the autonomous region of Guangxi.

== Preparations and Impact ==
=== Philippines ===
In the afternoon of August 18, as heavy rains poured down across Luzon, government officials were forced to suspend classes and government work in some cities. PAGASA subsequently issued several rainfall advisories. Major areas in Metro Manila and nearby provinces reported severe flooding. The Marikina River as high as 19 meters, forcing authorities evacuate nearby residents. 8 people in the Philippines have been killed due to flooding.

The NDRRMC quickly mobilized units from the military and its reserves in response to critical areas being hit by rising floodwaters. Units from both MMDA and PNRC also responded to the call and pre-positioned its personnel along critical areas of Metro Manila. Trami killed 18 people in the Philippines and caused intensive flooding all over the nation. The system also intensified floods brought by earlier monsoonal rains in China, wreaking havoc. In the final report by NDRRMC, 32 people were dead, while total damages were amounted to be ₱1.65 billion (US$37.7 million).

=== Taiwan and China ===
During August 20, the Taiwan Central Weather Bureau issued specific warnings for the land and sea. On August 21, gale-force winds struck heavily populated areas in northern Taiwan as Trami tracked in a westerly direction. The system brought torrential rainfall to the area, with Taipei receiving 12 inches of rain. A landslide occurred in Hsinchu county and trapped 70 residents. 10 people have been injured in Taiwan and more than 6000 had to evacuate homes. Despite gusty conditions and heavy rainfall, Trami only caused minor damage in Taiwan.

Damage across East China amounted to ¥3.43 billion (US$560 million), the majority of which occurred in Fujian Province. At least two people were killed by flooding in Guangxi Province.

Trami continued to move west, and made landfall in the Fujian province of China on August 22, 2:40 a.m. local time. Winds peaked at 126 km/h, and immense downpours were recorded over the cities of Fujian, Ningde, Putian and Sanming. 191 counties throughout the province had over 100 mm of rain. Many public services were seriously affected. Hundreds of thousands of residents were evacuated.

== See also ==
- Other tropical cyclones named Trami
- Other tropical cyclones named Maring
- Typhoon Haikui
- Typhoon Morakot
- Tropical Storm Fung-wong (2014)
