= Tropical Storm Barijat (2018) =

Pacific tropical storm in 2018

Tropical Storm Barijat (Neneng)
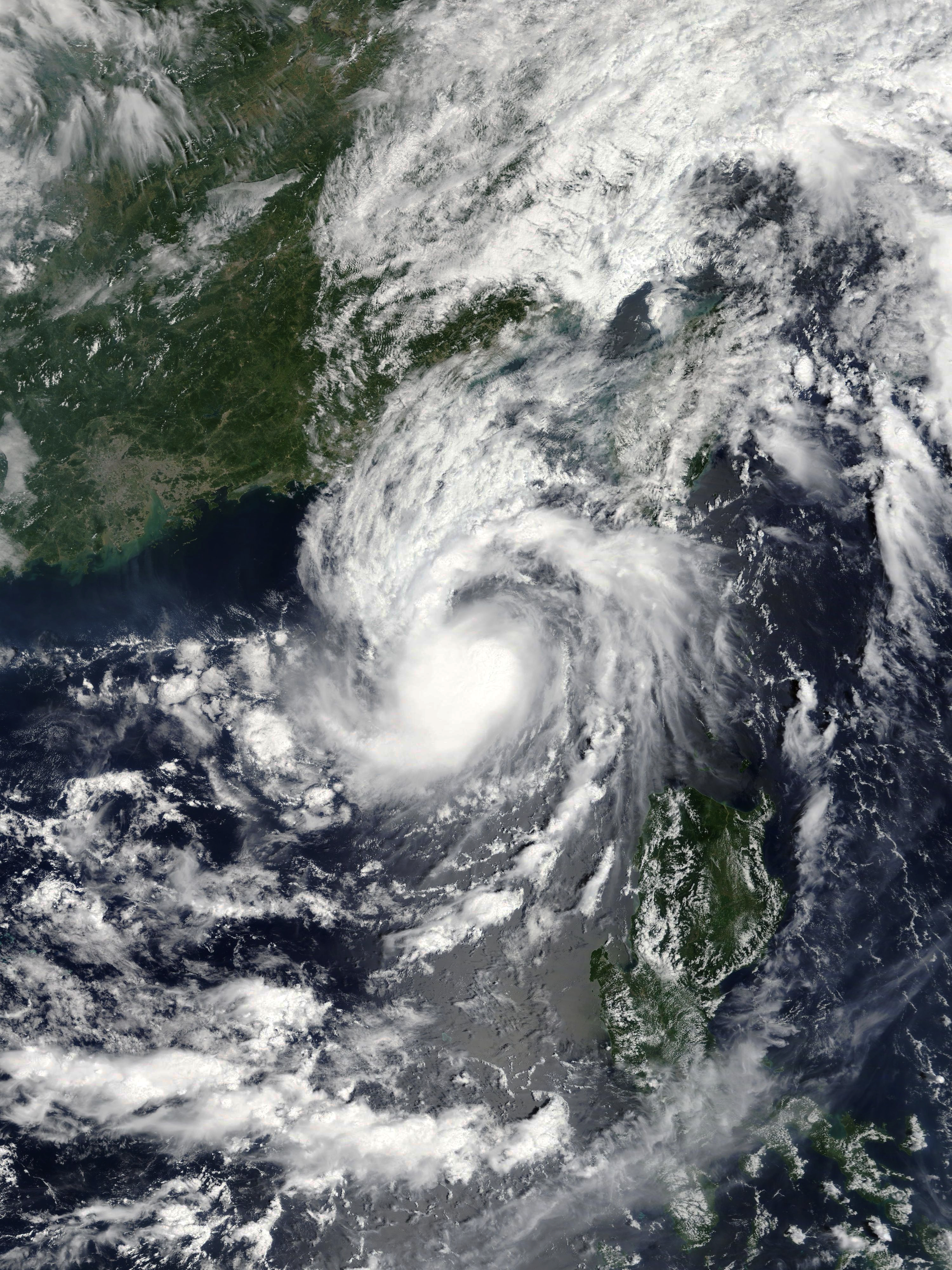
- Barijat at peak intensity in the South China Sea on September 11

Meteorological history
- Formed: September 8, 2018
- Dissipated: September 13, 2018

Tropical storm
- 10-minute sustained (JMA)
- Highest winds: 75 km/h (45 mph)
- Lowest pressure: 998 hPa (mbar); 29.47 inHg

Tropical storm
- 1-minute sustained (SSHWS/JTWC)
- Highest winds: 85 km/h (50 mph)
- Lowest pressure: 996 hPa (mbar); 29.41 inHg

Overall effects
- Fatalities: None
- Damage: $7.3 million
- Areas affected: Philippines, Taiwan, South China, Vietnam
- IBTrACS
- Part of the 2018 Pacific typhoon season

Tropical Storm Barijat, (Note: The name Barijat (Marshallese: parijet, [pʲærˠijtʲɛtˠ]) was contributed by the United States and refers to coastal lagoon shores impacted by typhoons in Marshallese.) known in the Philippines as Tropical Storm Neneng, was a weak and compact tropical storm that caused flooding in the far northern regions of the Philippines and Southern China in mid-September 2018. Barijat, which replaced Utor, was the thirty-third tropical depression and twenty-third tropical storm of the 2018 Pacific typhoon season, it was first noted as an area of convection in the South China Sea on September 6. On September 8, it was upgraded to a tropical depression, and by September 11, it intensified into a tropical storm, with the Japan Meteorological Agency (JMA) giving it the name Barijat. Barijat peaked in intensity 6 hours later, with 10-min winds of 40 knots (75 km/h; 45 mph) and 1-min winds of 45 knots (85 km/h; 50 mph). Barijat continued westward, and on November 12 at 00:30 UTC, it made landfall over Zhanjiang, quickly dissipating afterwards.

== Meteorological history ==
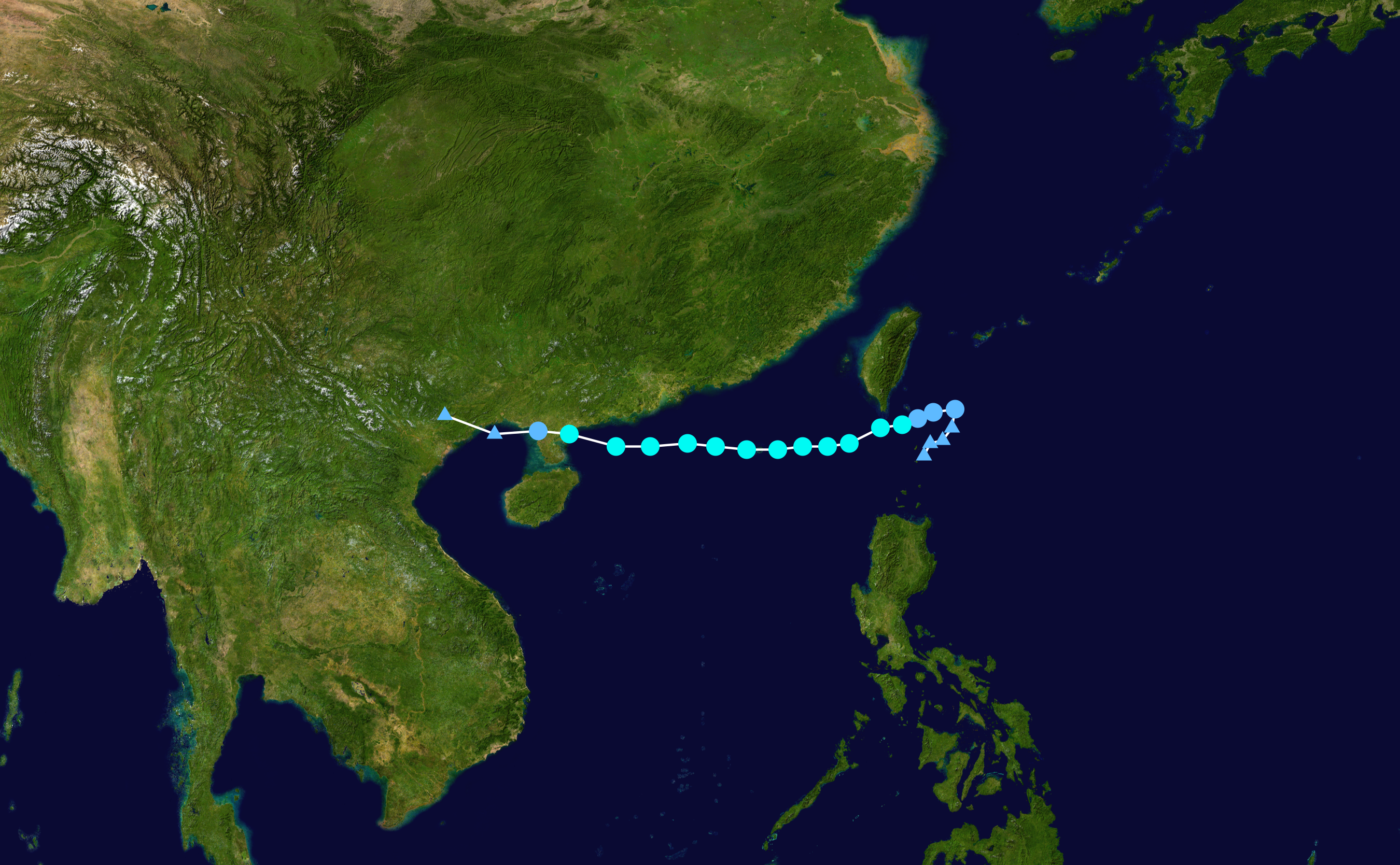
Map plotting the storm's track and intensity, according to the Saffir–Simpson scale Map key Saffir–Simpson scale Tropical depression (≤38 mph, ≤62 km/h) Tropical storm (39–73 mph, 63–118 km/h) Category 1 (74–95 mph, 119–153 km/h) Category 2 (96–110 mph, 154–177 km/h) Category 3 (111–129 mph, 178–208 km/h) Category 4 (130–156 mph, 209–251 km/h) Category 5 (≥157 mph, ≥252 km/h) Unknown Storm type Tropical cyclone Subtropical cyclone Extratropical cyclone, remnant low, tropical disturbance, or monsoon depression

On September 6 at 06:00 UTC, the Joint Typhoon Warning Center (JTWC) began monitoring an area of convection approximately 140 nautical miles (260 km; 160 mi) southwest of Manila, assessing its development potential as low. The next day at 20:00 UTC, its development potential was upgraded to medium as it continued northeastward, with satellite imagery depicting a partially exposed low-level circulation. The system continued northeastwards, and on September 8 at 06:00 UTC, both the JMA and the PAGASA assessed that the system had developed into a tropical depression, with the PAGASA assigning it the local name Neneng as the system was located inside the agency's area of responsibility. Later that day at 19:30 UTC, the JTWC issued a Tropical Cyclone Formation Alert for the system, and on September 9 at 06:00 UTC, the JTWC upgraded the system to a tropical depression, giving it the designation 27W, after which the system abruptly turned westward over the Bashi Channel. Infrared satellite imagery at 21:00 UTC showed a partially-exposed circulation center with deep convection over the southern portion of the storm.

The depression continued westward, being steered by a low to mid-level subtropical ridge, and on September 10 at 06:00 UTC, the JTWC upgraded 27W to a tropical storm as it was located approximately 80 nautical miles (150 km; 90 mi) south-southeast of Kaohsiung. 27W was located in a favorable environment with high sea surface temperatures, with infrared satellite imagery showing a small storm and flaring convection obscuring its circulation. 27W left the PAGASA's area of responsibility at 14:00 UTC, and on September 11 at 00:00 UTC, the JMA upgraded the depression to a tropical storm, assigning it the name Barijat. Hours later at 06:00 UTC, both the JMA and the JTWC assessed Barijat to have peaked, with the JMA estimating 10-minute sustained winds of 75 km/h (45 mph) and the JTWC estimating 1-minute sustained winds of 85 km/h (50 mph). Barijat continued westward under marginally favorable conditions, before weakening slightly the next day. Enhanced infrared satellite imagery showed that Barijat's circulation became partially exposed, and on September 12 at 00:30 UTC, Barijat made landfall over Zhanjiang, with satellite imagery showing weak convection being sheared, completely exposing the circulation center. On the next day at 06:00 UTC, both the JMA and the JTWC downgraded Barijat to a tropical depression, with the JTWC downgrading Barijat to a tropical disturbance and the JMA assessing Barijat to have dissipated 6 hours later.

== Preparations and impact ==
=== Philippines ===
Barijat's precursor brought rains over northern Luzon, enhancing the southwest monsoon in the process. It also brought gusty winds and heavy rains to the province of Batanes and to the Babuyan Islands, with the PAGASA raising Tropical Cyclone Wind Signal No. #1 over Batanes. The PAGASA advised residents living in the affected areas to take precautions against flooding and landslides, with fishermen and other people with small vessels being advised against sailing in the area. Barijat caused several landslides in Batanes, with floods entering schools and creeks overflowing. Barijat brought increased risk of flooding and landslides in the provinces of Batanes, Cagayan, and Isabela, with the soil saturation worsening the effects of Typhoon Mangkhut.

=== China ===
The weather bureau of Hainan issued an alert against strong gales and downpours. 40 thousand residents were evacuated in the cities of Zhanjiang and Maoming, with passenger and train services being halted due to safety concerns. 11 thousand fishermen, 32 thousand offshore workers, and 36 thousand boats were brought back to land. In Macau, there was no significant disruption to the city's activities. Damages in China were estimated at ¥50 million (US$7.3 million).

=== Vietnam ===
The northern parts of Vietnam were warned of possible flash flooding.

== See also ==
- Weather of 2018
- Tropical cyclones in 2018
