= List of storms named Trami =

The name Trami (Vietnamese: trà mi, [t͡ɕaː˨˩ mi˧˧]) has been used for five tropical cyclones in the western North Pacific Ocean. The name was contributed by Vietnam and means camellia in Vietnamese.

- Tropical Storm Trami (2001) (T0105, 07W, Gorio) – impacted Taiwan before crossing the island and dissipating in the strait as a depression.
- Tropical Storm Trami (2006) (T0623, 26W, Tomas) – not a threat to land.
- Severe Tropical Storm Trami (2013) (T1312, 12W, Maring) – caused flooding in the Philippines and China
- Typhoon Trami (2018) (T1824, 28W, Paeng) – a Category 5 super typhoon that affected Taiwan and Japan in mid-September.
- Severe Tropical Storm Trami (2024) (T2420, 22W, Kristine) – a deadly tropical storm that affected the Philippines, Vietnam and Thailand.

The name Trami was retired following the 2024 Pacific typhoon season and was replaced with Hoaban (Vietnamese: hoa ban, [hwaː˧˧ ʔɓaːn˧˧]), which refers to an orchid tree (Bauhinia variegata) in Vietnamese.
