= Typhoon Kim (1980) =

Pacific typhoon in 1980

Typhoon Kim (Osang)
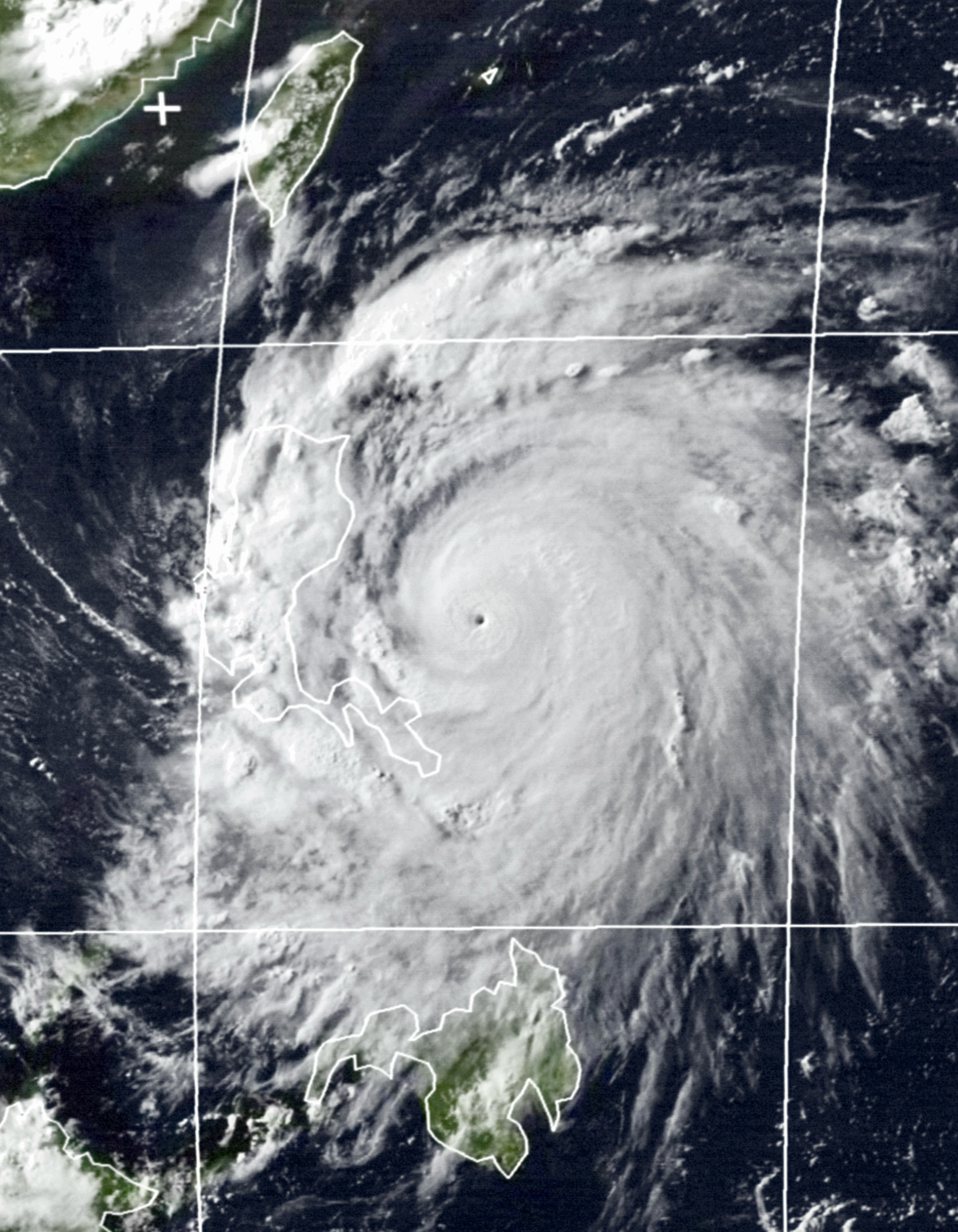
- Kim near peak intensity on July 24

Meteorological history
- Formed: July 19, 1980
- Dissipated: July 27, 1980

Very strong typhoon
- 10-minute sustained (JMA)
- Highest winds: 185 km/h (115 mph)
- Lowest pressure: 910 hPa (mbar); 26.87 inHg

Category 4-equivalent super typhoon
- 1-minute sustained (SSHWS/JTWC)
- Highest winds: 240 km/h (150 mph)
- Lowest pressure: 908 hPa (mbar); 26.81 inHg

Overall effects
- Fatalities: 41 total
- Areas affected: Philippines; South China; Vietnam
- IBTrACS
- Part of the 1980 Pacific typhoon season

Typhoon Kim, known in the Philippines as Super Typhoon Osang, was the second typhoon in a week to directly affect the Philippines during July 1980. Like Typhoon Joe, Kim formed from the near equatorial monsoon trough in the northwestern Pacific Ocean on July 19. The disturbance tracked quickly westward-northwest underneath a subtropical ridge, reaching tropical storm strength on the July 21 and typhoon strength on July 23. After developing an eye, Kim began to rapidly intensify, and during the afternoon of July 24, peaked in intensity as a super typhoon. Several hours later, Kim made landfall over the Philippines, but the storm had weakened considerably by this time. Throughout the Philippines, 40 people were killed, 2 via drownings, and 19,000 others were directly affected. A total of 12,000 homes were destroyed and 5,000 villages were flooded. Less than a week earlier, the same areas were affected by Joe; however, Kim was considered the more damaging of the two typhoons. Land interaction took its toll on Kim, and upon entering the South China Sea, the storm was down below typhoon intensity. Kim continued northwestward but its disrupted circulation prevented re-intensification, and it remained a tropical storm until hitting southern China July 27 to the northeast of Hong Kong, where only slight damage was reported. Later that day, Kim dissipated.

== Meteorological history ==
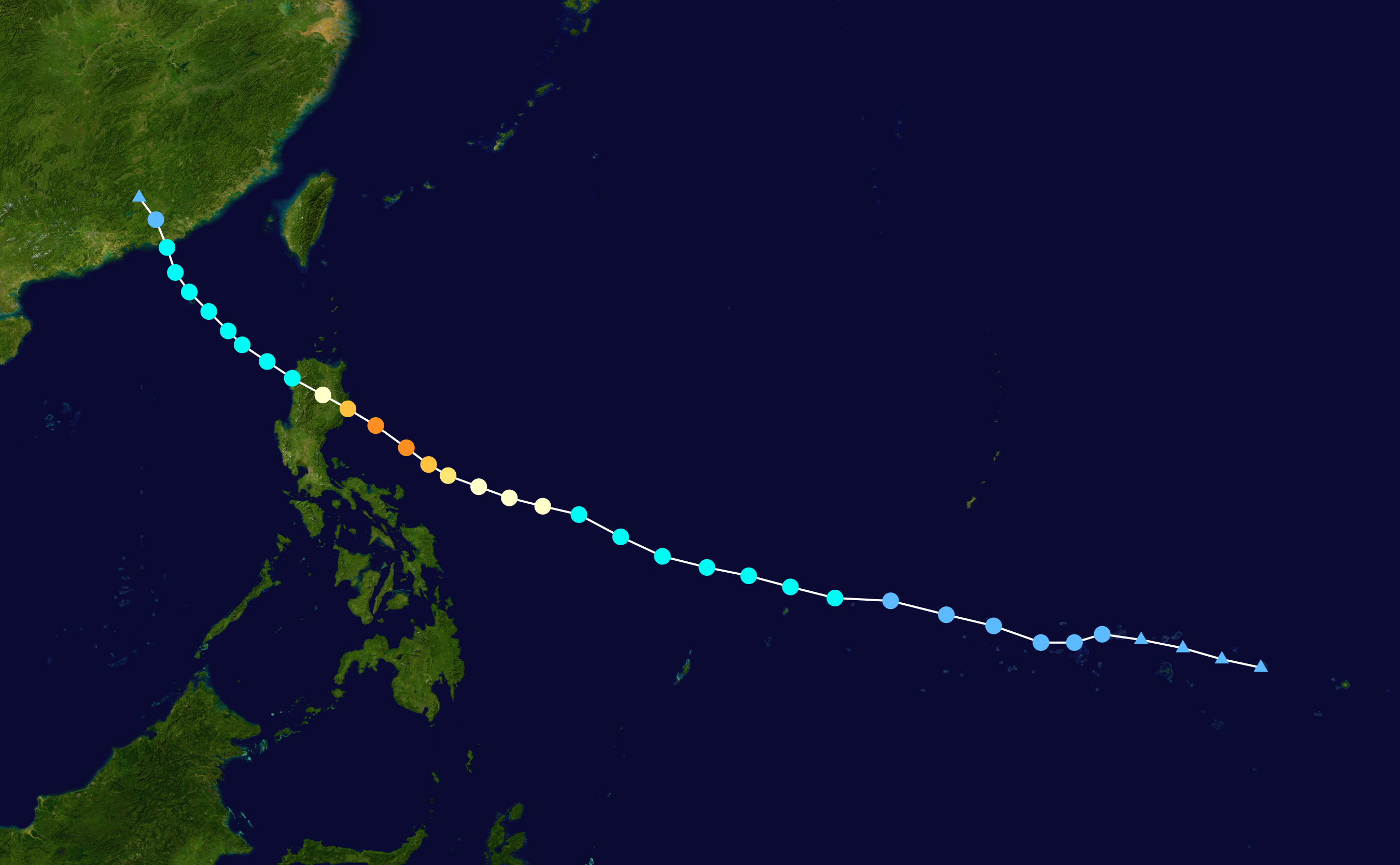
Map plotting the storm's track and intensity, according to the Saffir–Simpson scale Map key Saffir–Simpson scale Tropical depression (≤38 mph, ≤62 km/h) Tropical storm (39–73 mph, 63–118 km/h) Category 1 (74–95 mph, 119–153 km/h) Category 2 (96–110 mph, 154–177 km/h) Category 3 (111–129 mph, 178–208 km/h) Category 4 (130–156 mph, 209–251 km/h) Category 5 (≥157 mph, ≥252 km/h) Unknown Storm type Tropical cyclone Subtropical cyclone Extratropical cyclone, remnant low, tropical disturbance, or monsoon depression

An area of disturbed weather developed in association with the monsoon trough that was situated near the equator on July 19. At 20:04 UTC, the Joint Typhoon Warning Center (JTWC) issued a Tropical Cyclone Formation Alert for the system, primarily because the disturbance was over warm water and low wind shear. Four hours later, the Japan Meteorological Agency (JMA) classified the system as a tropical depression. (Note: The Japan Meteorological Agency is the official Regional Specialized Meteorological Center for the western Pacific Ocean.) Following reports from a Hurricane hunter plane of a well-defined surface circulation and winds of 40 to 50 km/h (25 to 30 mph), the JTWC classified the system as Tropical Depression 11 midday on July 20. At the time, the depression was located over 600 km (375 mi) southeast of Guam.

The depression tracked west-northwest, passing south of Guam and very near Ulithi around noon on July 21. Based on surface observations of 65 km/h (40 mph) on the island and data from Hurricane hunters, both the JTWC and JMA upgraded the depression into a tropical storm at 18:00 UTC. Post-storm analysis from the JTWC indicated that Kim attained tropical storm status six hours earlier, despite aircraft data suggesting that the storm was not well stacked vertically. Further intensification was slow to occur as Kim tracked west-northwest, following Typhoon Joe across the Philippine Sea. At 06:00 UTC on July 23, a Hurricane hunter aircraft indicated falling pressures and the beginning of an eyewall. Based on this, both the JTWC and JMA announced that Kim obtained typhoon intensity. Around this time, the Philippine Atmospheric, Geophysical and Astronomical Services Administration (PAGASA) also began to monitor the storm and assigned it with the local name Osang. Continuing to track west-northwest beneath a large subtropical ridge, Kim began to clear out an eye on the evening of July 23; subsequently, Kim, as forecast by the JTWC, entered a period of rapid deepening. At 06:00 UTC July 24, the JTWC increased the intensity of Kim to 185 km/h (115 mph), equal to a Category 3 hurricane on the United States-based Saffir-Simpson Hurricane Wind Scale (SSHWS), while the JMA raised the winds to 170 km/h (105 mph). Ten hours later, a Hurricane hunter aircraft measured a pressure of 908 mbar (26.81 inHg). This data justified the JTWC declaring Kim a super typhoon and increasing the wind speed to 240 km/h (150 mph). At 18:00 on July 24, the JMA estimated that Kim reached its peak intensity to 170 km/h (105 mph) and assigned a pressure of 910 mbar (26.87 inHg). (Note: Wind estimates from the JMA and most other basins throughout the world are sustained over 10 minutes, while estimates from the United States-based Joint Typhoon Warning Center are sustained over 1 minute. 10-minute winds are about 1.14 times the amount of 1-minute winds.)

Almost immediately thereafter, reports from the same Hurricane Hunter aircraft indicated that the pressure of the typhoon rose sharply, likely in response to decreased inflow caused by Kim's close proximity to land. The JTWC estimated that Kim made landfall along the coast of Luzon at an intensity of 185 km/h (115 mph), while the JMA reported that Kim moved ashore with winds of 145 km/h (90 mph). Continuing to weaken due to land interaction, Kim fell below typhoon intensity once it emerged into the South China Sea, according to both the JTWC and JMA. The JTWC expected Kim to revive over water in manner similar to Typhoon Joe, but this did not occur. The storm's inner core was disrupted by land, with Hurricane hunters constantly finding a poorly organized tropical cyclone. Kim began to move northwest in response to a weakness created in the subtropical ridge created by Joe. At 06:00 UTC on July 27, Kim crossed the coastline of China around 165 km (105 mi) northeast of Hong Kong. At the time of its second landfall, both the JTWC and JMA estimated winds of 80 km/h (50 mph). Twelve hours later, both the JTWC and JMA ceased tracking Kim.

== Preparations and impact ==
Typhoon Kim caused widespread flooding across Luzon. In Manila, where floodwaters rose to more than 610 mm (24 in) in some suburbs, government offices and schools were closed. There, both Philippine Airlines and Philippine National Railways canceled all trips to the rest of the country. The coast guard suspended sailing permits to ships throughout the country. The Isabela province was the hardest hit by Typhoon Kim. Almost 15 people were killed in the Cagayan province. Across the Philippines, 40 people were killed, 2 via drownings, and 19,000 others were affected. A total of 12,000 homes were destroyed and 5,000 villages were flooded. Less than a week earlier, the same areas were affected by Typhoon Joe; Kim was considered the more damaging of the two systems.

The typhoon brought showers to much of southern China, extending as far north as Pratas Island, Taiwan (ROC). Wind gusts of 130 km/h (80 mph) were measured in the town of Shantou. In Hong Kong, a No 1. hurricane signal was issued on July 25. The next day, the signal was increased to a No 3. hurricane signal. All signals were dropped late on July 22, after Kim moved inland. A minimum pressure of 998.9 mbar (29.50 inHg) was recorded at the Hong Kong Royal Observatory (HKO) on July 27, around the time Kim made its closest approach to the city. On Waglan Island, a peak wind speed of 78 km/h (48 mph) was reported while a peak wind gust of 128 km/h (80 mph) occurred at Star Ferry. HKO observed 136.3 mm (5.37 in) of rain over a 72-hour period. Within the vicinity of Hong Kong, minor damage was reported and there were no injuries. Power was knocked out in the urban city of Kowloon. Some villages were flooded and two landslides occurred.

== See also ==
- Other typhoons named Kim
- Similar early season Philippine typhoons
  - Typhoon Koryn (1993)
  - Typhoon Percy (1990)
  - Typhoon Peggy (1986)
  - Typhoon Vera (1983)
  - Typhoon Eli (1992)
