= 2008 Pacific typhoon season =

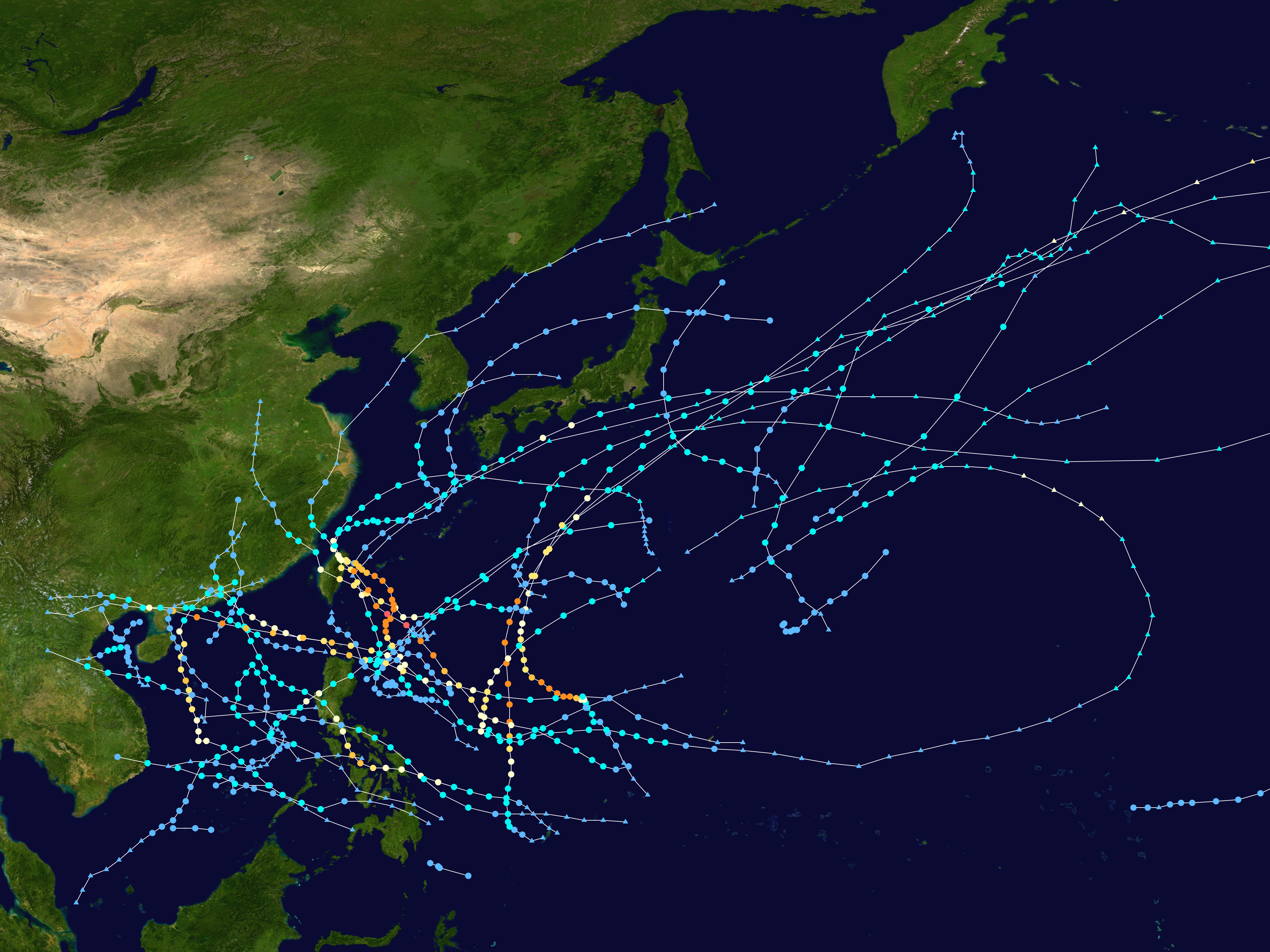
- Season summary map

Seasonal boundaries
- First system formed: January 13, 2008
- Last system dissipated: December 18, 2008

Strongest storm
- Name: Jangmi
  - Maximum winds: 215 km/h (130 mph) (10-minute sustained)
  - Lowest pressure: 905 hPa (mbar)

Seasonal statistics
- Total depressions: 40, 1 unofficial
- Total storms: 22
- Typhoons: 11
- Very strong typhoons: 6
- Violent typhoons: 2
- Total fatalities: 1,965 total
- Total damage: $5.97 billion (2008 USD)

Related articles
- Timeline of the 2008 Pacific typhoon season; 2008 Atlantic hurricane season; 2008 Pacific hurricane season; 2008 North Indian Ocean cyclone season

The 2008 Pacific typhoon season was a below average season which featured 22 named storms, eleven typhoons, and two super typhoons. The season had no official bounds; it ran year-round in 2008, but most tropical cyclones tend to form in the northwestern Pacific Ocean between May and November. These dates conventionally delimit the period of each year when most tropical cyclones form in the northwestern Pacific Ocean.

The scope of this article is limited to the Pacific Ocean, north of the equator and west of the International Date Line. Storms that form east of the date line and north of the equator are called hurricanes; see 2008 Pacific hurricane season. Tropical storms formed in the entire Western North Pacific basin are assigned a name by the Japan Meteorological Agency. Tropical depressions formed in this basin are given a number with a "W" suffix by the United States' Joint Typhoon Warning Center. In addition, the Philippine Atmospheric, Geophysical and Astronomical Services Administration (PAGASA) assigns names to tropical cyclones (including tropical depressions) that enter or form in the Philippine area of responsibility. These names, however, are not in common use outside of the Philippines.

== Seasonal forecasts ==
TSR forecasts Date	Tropical storms	Total Typhoons	Intense TCs	ACE	Ref.
Average (1965–2007)	26.6	16.8	8.7	303	
March 10, 2008	–	–	6.4	237	
May 6, 2008	28.3	18.2	7.7	274	
July 6, 2008	28.3	18.2	7.5	268	
August 5, 2008	28.3	18.2	7.8	277	
Other forecasts Date	Forecast Center	TCs	Tropical storms	Typhoons	Ref
April 18, 2008	GCACIC	33	30	19	
June 24, 2008	GCACIC	33	30	19	
July 16, 2008	PAGASA	22	–	–	
2008 season	Forecast Center	Tropical cyclones	Tropical storms	Typhoons	Ref.
Actual activity:	JMA	38	22	11	
Actual activity:	JTWC	27	27	12	
Actual activity:	PAGASA	21	16	11	

Each season several national meteorological services and scientific agencies forecast either the expected amount tropical cyclones, tropical storms, and typhoons forming in a season and/or how many tropical cyclones will affect a country or territory.

=== City University of Hong Kong ===
Since the 2000 typhoon season, the Laboratory for Atmospheric Research or the Guy Carpenter Asia-Pacific Climate Impact Centre (GCACIC), both of the City University of Hong Kong have issued forecasts of activity for each upcoming typhoon season. Forecasts are issued in April and June of each year and predict how many tropical cyclones, tropical storms, and typhoons there will be in a season. This season, the GCACIC is predicting a slightly more active than usual season. An average season, according to the GCACIC, has 31 tropical cyclones, 27 named storms, and 17 typhoons. In its April forecast, the GCACIC predicted 33 total tropical cyclones, 30 named storms, and 19 typhoons before predicting the same number of systems, tropical storms, and typhoons in its June forecast.

=== Tropical Storm Risk Consortium ===
Since the 2000 typhoon season, the Tropical Storm Risk Consortium (TSR) of the University College of London have issued forecasts of activity for each upcoming typhoon season. During 2008 forecasts were issued in early March, May, July and August and predict how many tropical storms, typhoons and intense typhoons there will be during a season. (Note: According to TSR: An intense typhoon is a typhoon that has 1-minute winds of at least 175 km/h (110 mph)) In its March forecast, TSR Predicted that the season would be about 20% below average with six intense tropical cyclones, however due to conflicting climate signals it was not possible to predict how many tropical storms and typhoons would form. In its May forecast, TSR were now able to predict how many tropical storms and typhoons, would form during the season. They also predicted that the season would be near normal with 28 tropical storms, 18 typhoons and 8 intense typhoons forming during the season. In their July and August forecasts, TSR predicted the same amount of tropical storms and typhoons and intense typhoons as their May forecasts.

=== National meteorological service predictions ===
As the name Frank was retired from PAGASA's naming lists they also released a prediction stating that there would be 16 more Tropical cyclones of any strength to pass through PAGASA'S area of responsibility which added to the six that had already moved through PAGASA's area of responsibility brought a total of 22 cyclones to pass through the PAGASA's area of responsibility during 2008.

== Seasonal summary ==
The first tropical depression of the season, formed in mid January to the west of the Philippines. As it moved west, the depression did not develop any further and dissipated on January 18. After two more Tropical depressions, the first named storm Typhoon Neoguri formed in April to the east of Mindanao. During May as a result of convection being enhanced within the Philippine sea and the South China Sea four named storms formed which along with 1971 and 1980 was the joint highest incidence in May since 1951. Between June and October, the region was considered to be very quiet by the JMA as they only named 13 tropical cyclones. In November and December, only four tropical cyclones were named by the JMA and all four formed within the Philippine sea and the South China Sea.

== Systems ==
=== Tropical Depression 01W ===
- Tropical depression (JMA)
- Tropical storm (SSHWS)
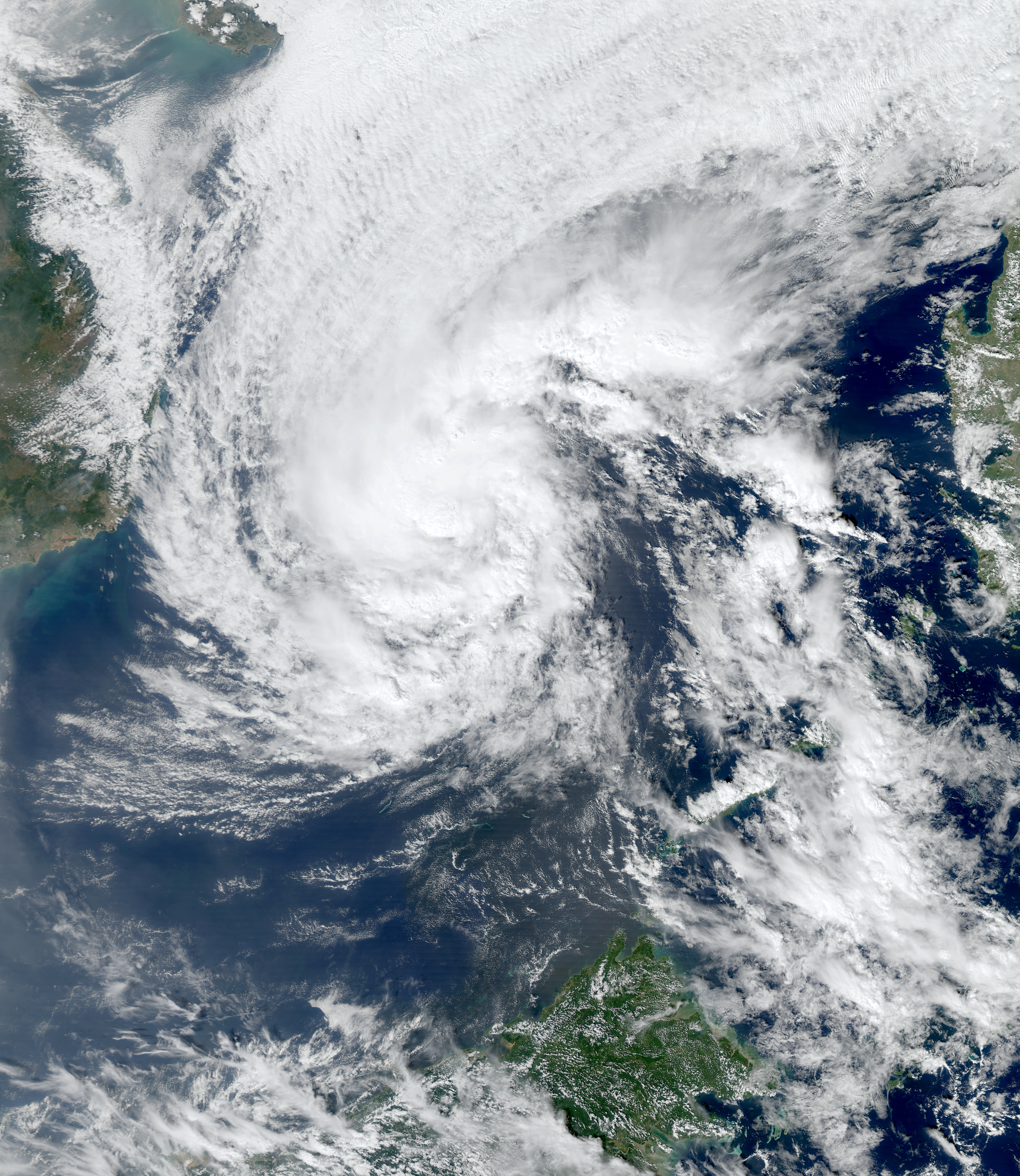
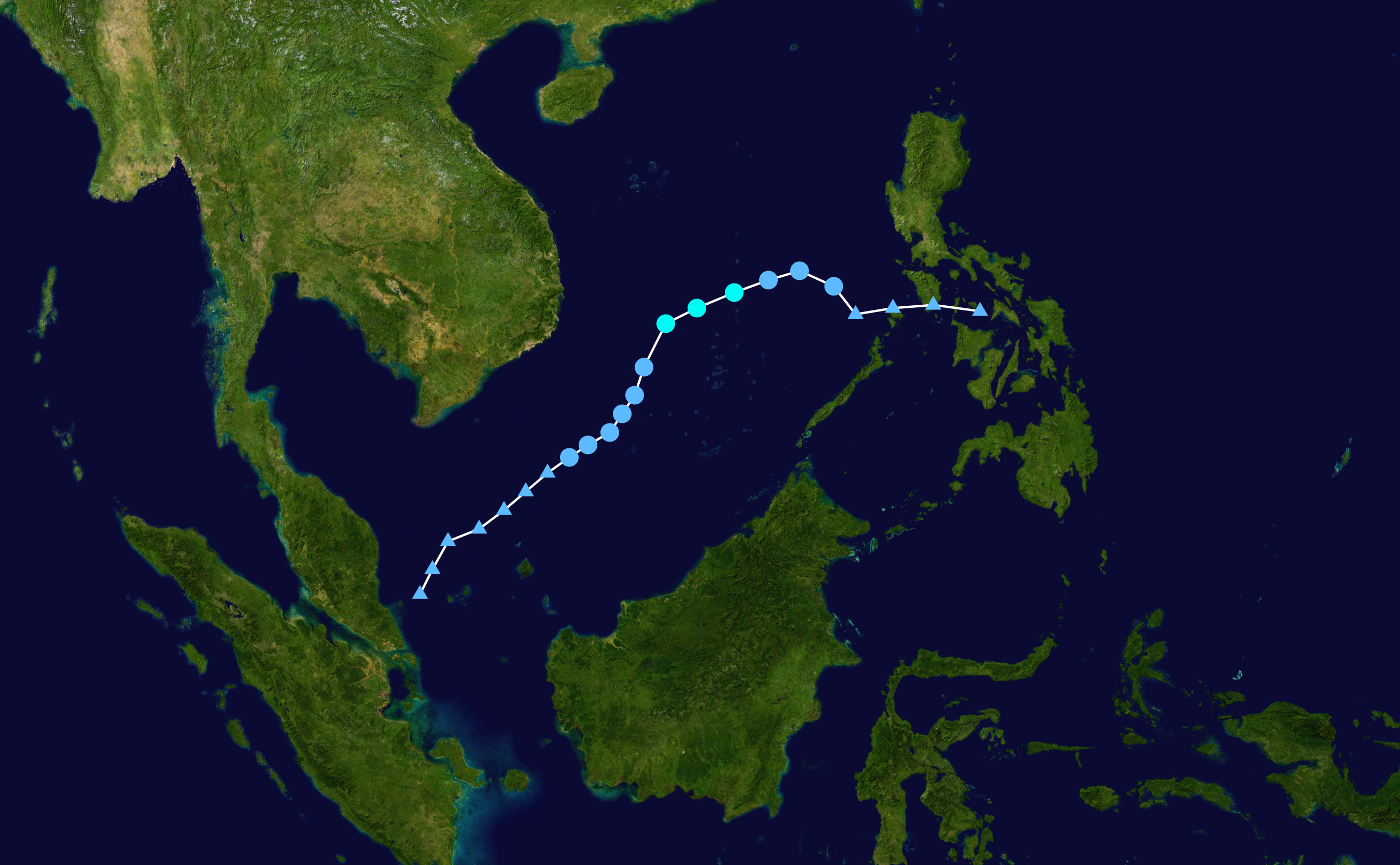
- Duration: January 13 – January 18
- Peak intensity: 55 km/h (35 mph) (10-min); 1004 hPa (mbar)

Early on January 11, the JTWC reported that an area of convection had persisted about 1,010 km (630 mi) to the southeast of Manila in the Philippines. The disturbance was located near to a developing low-level circulation center which was weak and remained displaced from the deep convection whilst located in an area of low to moderate vertical windshear. During the next 24 hours the disturbance developed further with a Tropical Cyclone Formation Alert being issued the next day by the JTWC as the disturbance now had a well defined low level circulation center with convective banding on the northwestern edge. Early on January 13, both the JMA and the JTWC reported that the first depression of the season had developed about 360 km (220 mi) to the west of Manila. Later that day the JMA reported that the depression had reached its 10-minute peak windspeeds of 55 km/h (34 mph). However early on January 14 the JTWC reported that the depression had continued to intensify and upgraded the depression to a Tropical storm and then six hours later reported 1-minute peak windspeeds of 65 km/h (40 mph). Later that day it was downgraded to a Tropical depression due to weakening deep convection and a partially exposed low level circulation center. Over the next few days the depression moved towards the east until early on January 18 when both the JMA and the JTWC reported that it had dissipated off the Malaysian coastline. There were no reports of any damages or casualties associated with the depression.

=== Typhoon Neoguri (Ambo) ===
- Typhoon (JMA)
- Category 3 typhoon (SSHWS)
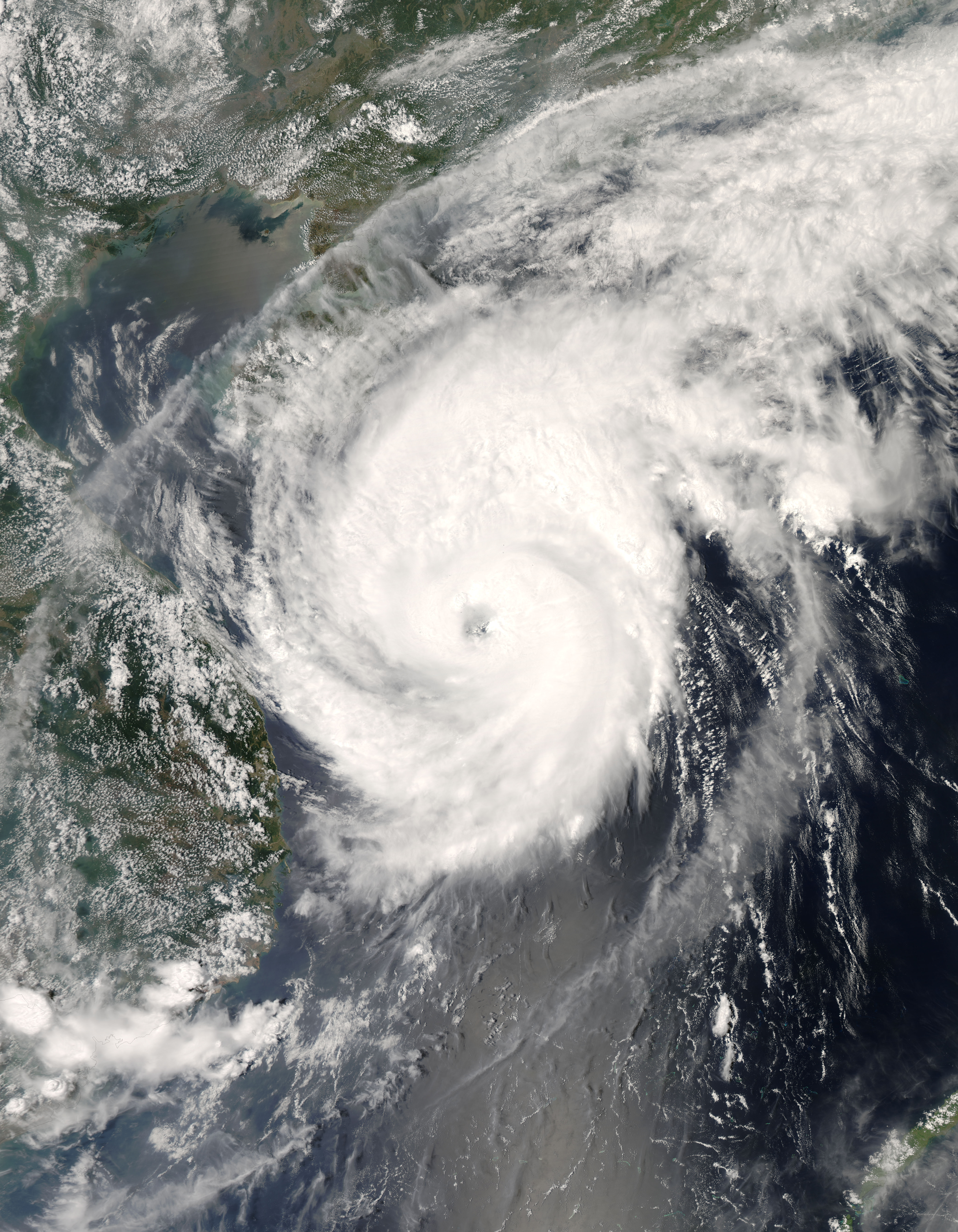
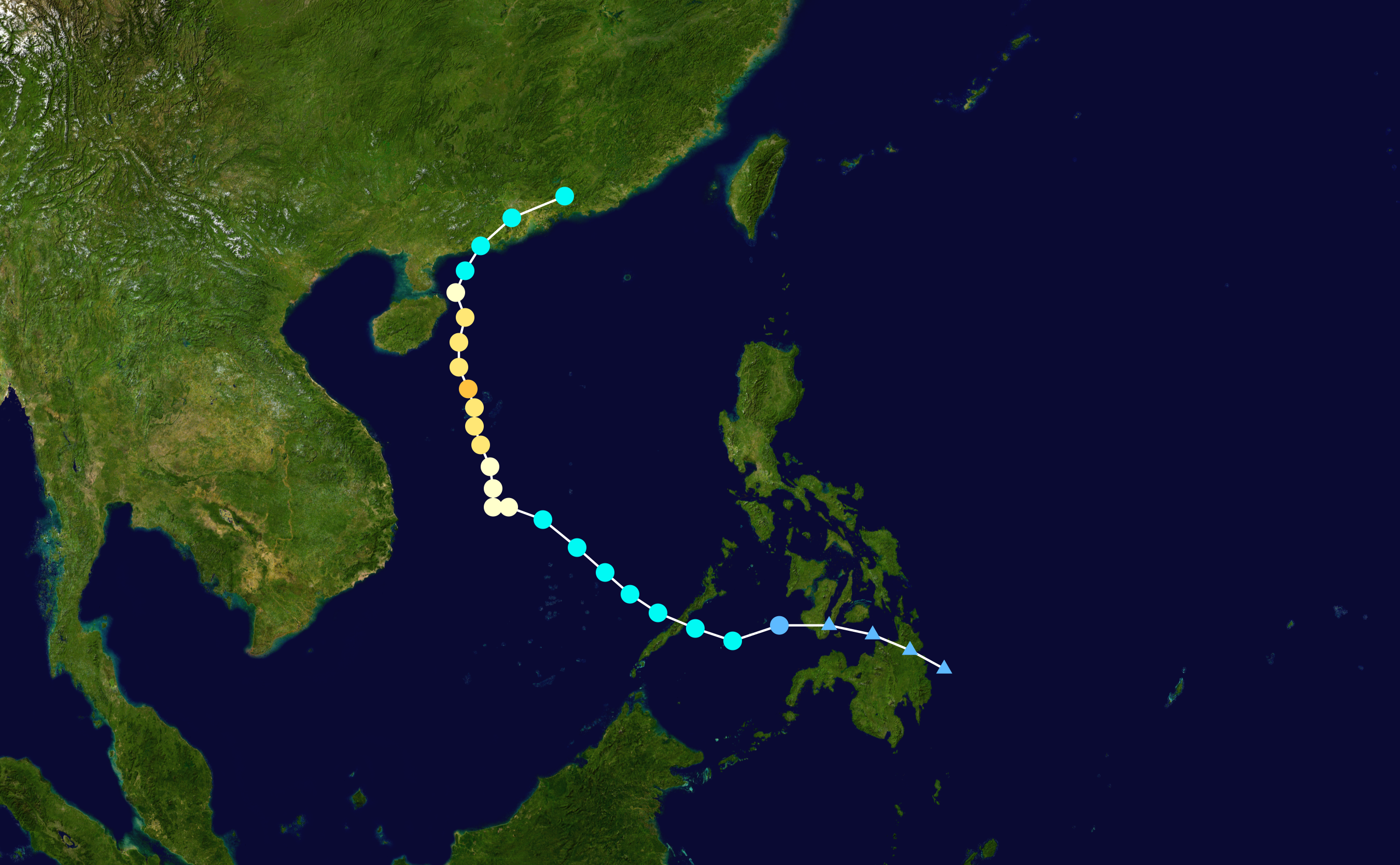
- Duration: April 13 – April 20
- Peak intensity: 150 km/h (90 mph) (10-min); 960 hPa (mbar)

On April 11, an area of convection with an area of low pressure was located between Palau and Yap. Early on April 13, a low-level circulation developed near Mindanao. The JMA designated the system as a minor tropical depression on the same day, and PAGASA began warning on the system, naming it Tropical Depression "Ambo". The low continued to get better organized and early on April 14, the Joint Typhoon Warning Center began issuing advisories on Tropical Depression 02W, which was located about north of Zamboanga City, Philippines. Later that day, the agency upgraded it to tropical storm status, based on satellite intensity estimates. The JMA upgraded the system to a tropical storm, naming it Neoguri, the next day. Early April 16, the system was upgraded to severe tropical storm status, and then reached typhoon status a few hours later. The typhoon continued north, weakening as it did so. The cyclone made landfall as a weak tropical storm on Guangdong province in southern China, and the final advisories from both agencies were issued shortly after.

As the typhoon approached and passed Hainan Province, about 120,000 people were evacuated from low-lying areas. According to the China Meteorological Administration, it was the earliest in the year a tropical cyclone had ever impacted China (the old record was for Typhoon Wanda on May 3, 1971). 42,000 residents were displaced in the aftermath of Neoguri. 18 Chinese fisherman and 22 Vietnamese fisherman remain missing due to the storm. Three fatalities were confirmed in China, two due to a road being covered in a mud flow, and another due to winds blowing a sheet of aluminum into a person, throwing them off the roof of a stadium.

=== Typhoon Rammasun (Butchoy) ===
- Violent typhoon (JMA)
- Category 4 super typhoon (SSHWS)
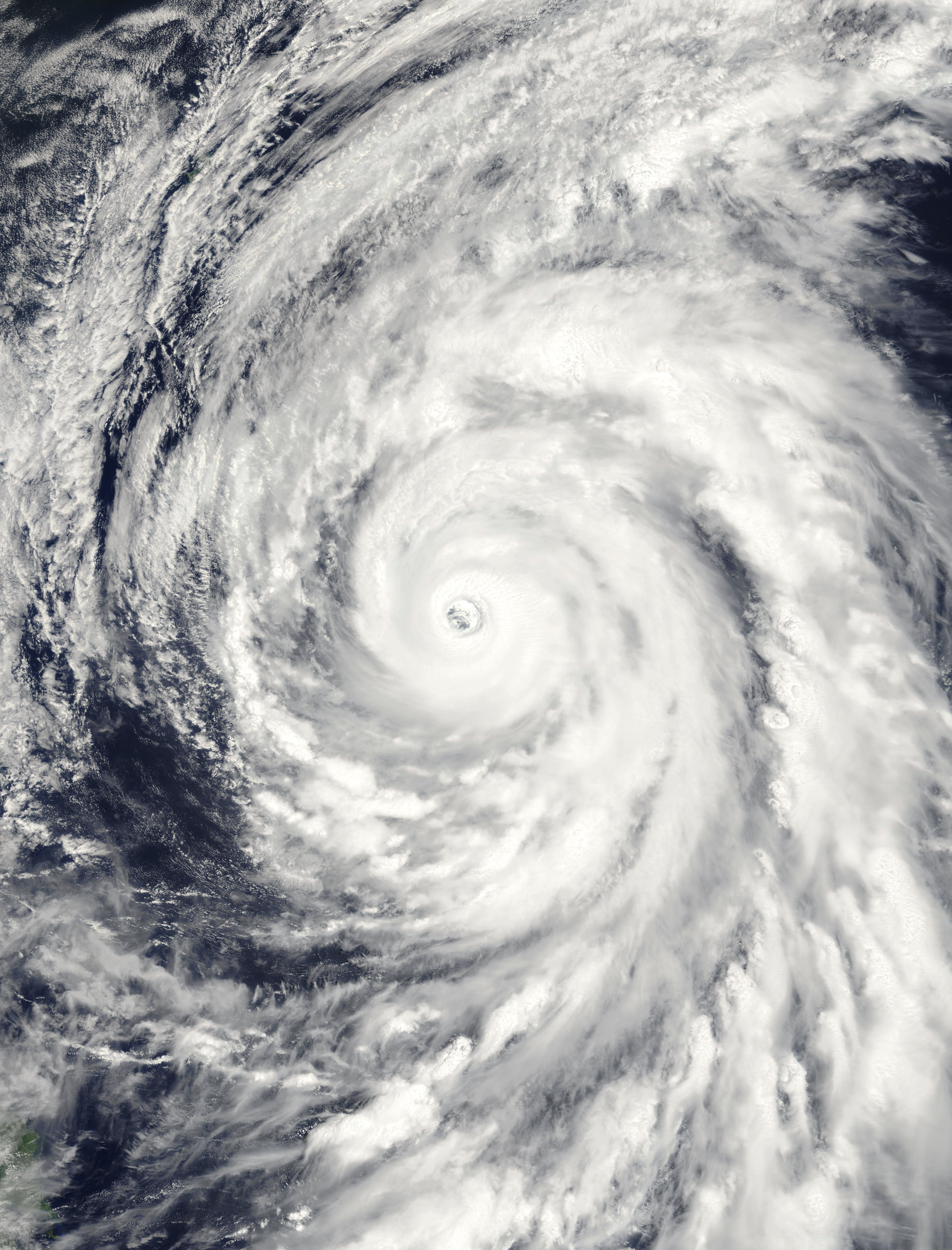
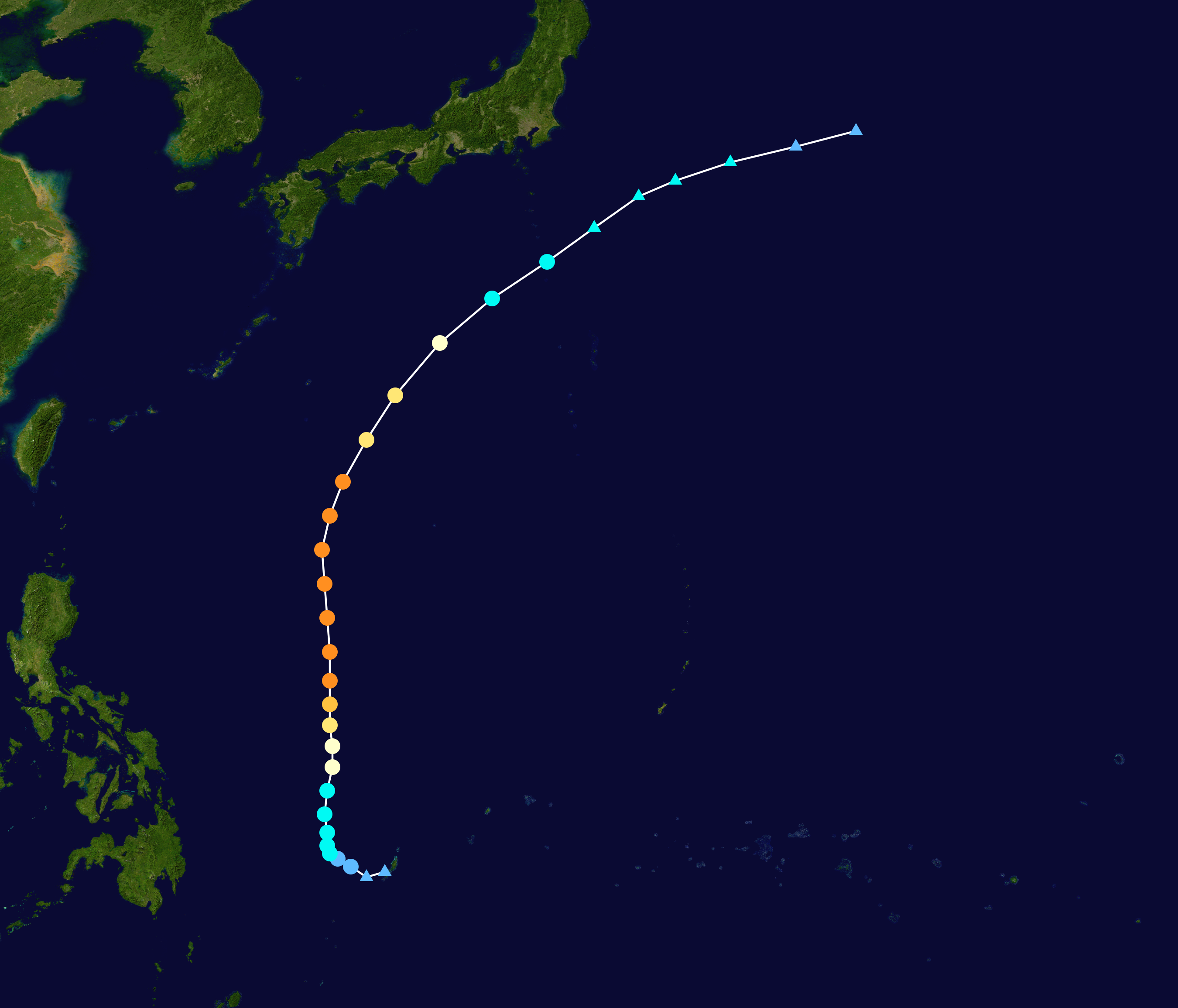
- Duration: May 7 – May 13
- Peak intensity: 195 km/h (120 mph) (10-min); 915 hPa (mbar)

Early on May 7, PAGASA designated an area of low pressure which was about 790 km east of Mindanao as Tropical Depression Butchoy. Around the same time the Japan Meteorological Agency (JMA) and the Joint Typhoon Warning Center (JTWC) also designated the area of low pressure as a Tropical depression with the JTWC assigning the number 03W to the depression.

Later that day the JMA upgraded the Tropical Depression to Tropical Storm status with RSMC Tokyo assigning the name Rammasun to the storm. It quickly organized, intensifying into a typhoon on May 9. Rapid intensification continued and it strengthened into a Category 4-equivalent typhoon by early on May 10, and a super typhoon by midday.

Rammasun continued on a northerly path, and reached a peak of 105 knots (194 km/h) and 915 hPa on May 10. Soon after, the typhoon began slowly weakening. The JTWC downgraded it to a typhoon on May 11. On May 12, the weakening became more rapid, and the JMA downgraded the system to a severe tropical storm, while the JTWC issued its last advisory, noting that it was extratropical. The JMA, however, held onto Rammasun until early May 13, when it downgraded the cyclone to a low and issued its final advisory. Though it never hit land, it was the second strongest May typhoon in recorded history, behind Typhoon Lola of 1986.

Rammasun brushed the Japanese coastline as it became extratropical on May 13 delivering strong winds and high waves. Along with moderate to heavy rain, winds gusted up to 52 mph (84 km/h) as the storm moved out to sea.

A strong storm from the "tail" of Rammasun struck the Philippines as it passed south of Japan. The winds brought by the storm caused severe damage to some buildings and numerous trees some weighing tonnes were uprooted. The damage may have been due to a possible tornado but there is no clarification for this possibility. At least 40 people were injured and damage totaled to 11 million PHP (US$280,000).

=== Severe Tropical Storm Matmo (Dindo) ===
- Severe tropical storm (JMA)
- Tropical storm (SSHWS)
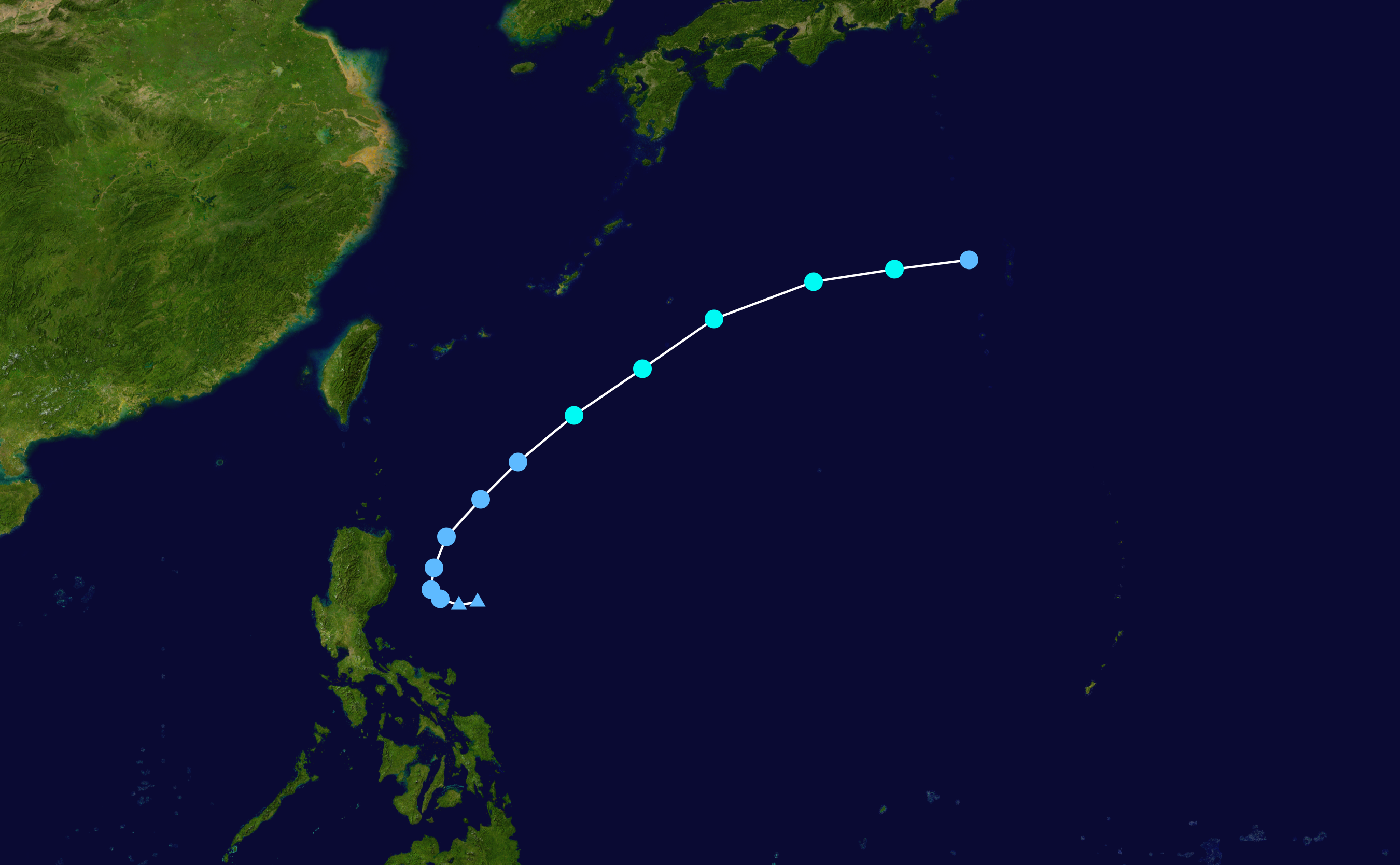
- Duration: May 14 – May 17
- Peak intensity: 95 km/h (60 mph) (10-min); 992 hPa (mbar)

On May 13, a tropical disturbance formed about 550 km (340 mi), to the east of Manila in the Philippines. The disturbance was located in an area of low vertical wind shear and had a consolidating low-level circulation center. The JTWC then issued a Tropical Cyclone Formation Alert on the disturbance early the next day, as deep convection was building near to the low-pressure area. Later that day both the JTWC and the JMA upgraded the disturbance to a tropical depression, citing good outflow. Early on May 15, as the storm was moving towards the northwest, the JMA upgraded the depression to a tropical storm. The Philippine Atmospheric, Geophysical and Astronomical Services Administration (PAGASA) then designated the storm as Tropical Depression Dindo. While the storm accelerated to the northwest in response to a mid-latitude trough, the JTWC upped into a tropical storm and had reached its peak intensity with winds of 75 km/h (45 mph). Early on May 16, both PAGASA and the JTWC issued their final advisories on the storm as it approached the edge of PAGASA's Area of responsibility, with the JTWC reporting that Matmo was now extratropical. However, data from the JMa suggested that it obtained peak wind speeds of 95 km/h (60 mph) at this time, which made Matmo a severe tropical storm. Though, within their next advisory, the JMA downgraded Matmo to a tropical storm before dissipating the net day.

In preparation for Tropical Storm Matmo, the Japan Meteorological Agency issued warnings for the, Naha, Moji and Yokohama areas of Japan, but in the end, there was no impact.

=== Severe Tropical Storm Halong (Cosme) ===
- Severe tropical storm (JMA)
- Category 1 typhoon (SSHWS)
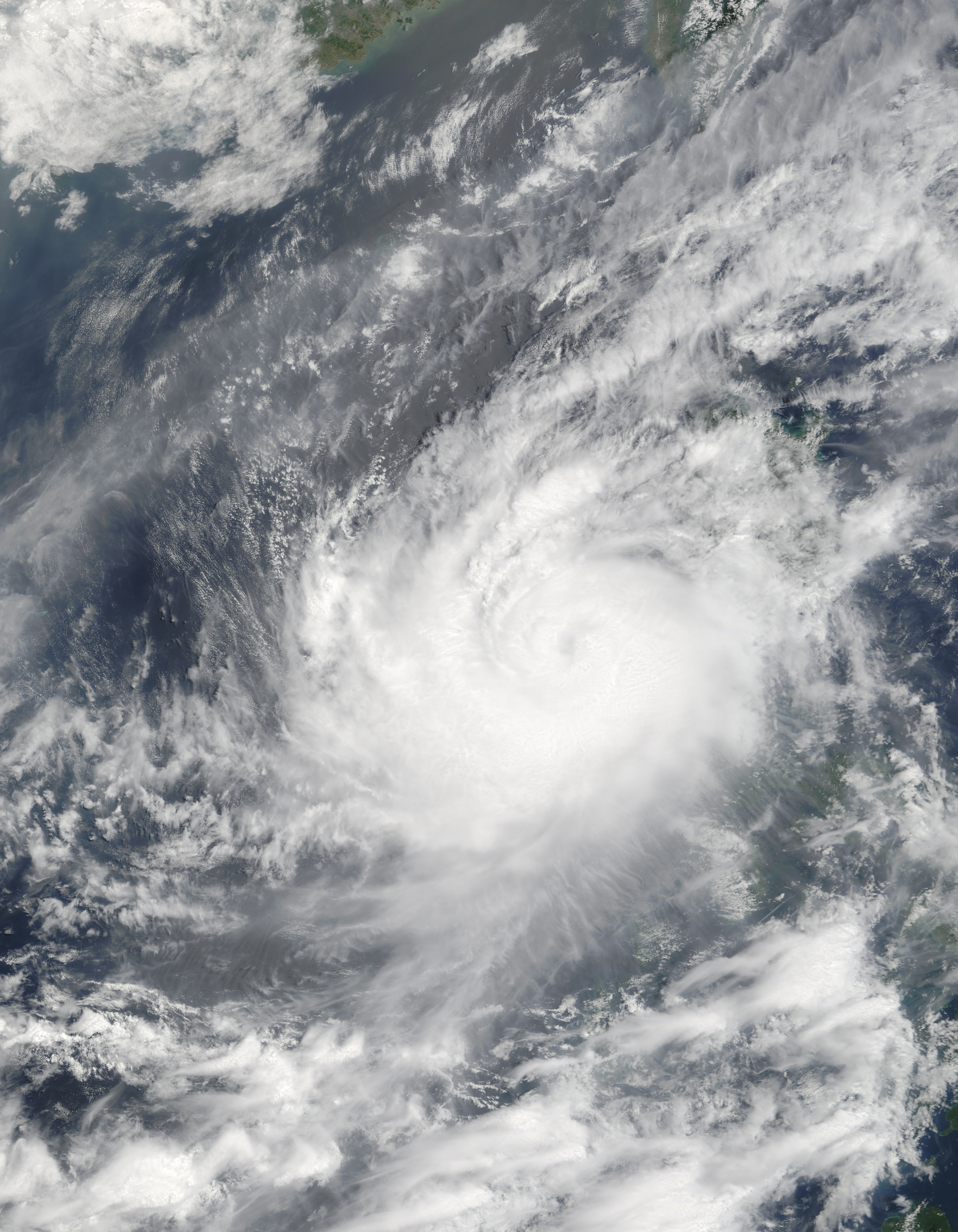
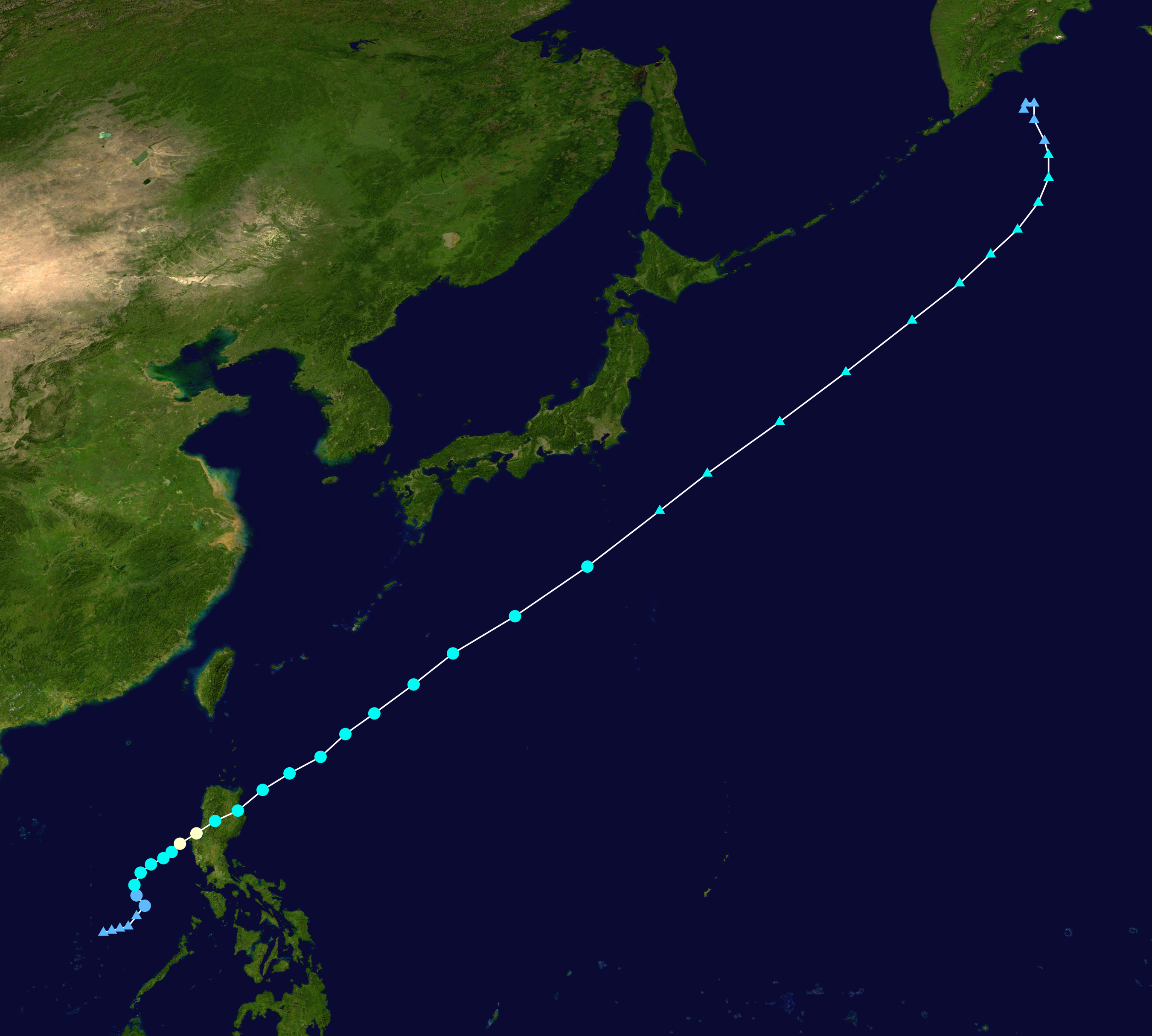
- Duration: May 14 – May 20
- Peak intensity: 110 km/h (70 mph) (10-min); 970 hPa (mbar)

Early on May 14, PAGASA upgraded a tropical disturbance west of the Philippines to Tropical Depression Cosme. Later that day, the JTWC issued a TCFA, later as the first advisory on the system as Tropical Depression 05W. On May 16, the JMA upgraded 05W to Halong. Later that day, it was upgraded to a Severe Tropical Storm by JMA, and a Typhoon by JTWC, reaching its peak of 60 knots (110 km/h) on early May 17. It made landfall on western Pangasinan, and weakened while crossing northern Luzon, but after reaching open waters, it re-organized while accelerating northeastward. The system intensified to a severe tropical storm again, but never reached its previous peak intensity and began weakening as it moved northeast. The JTWC and the JMA issued their final advisories on May 20.

In Luzon, the storm caused 58 deaths and $94 million (USD) in damage. The storm destroyed 43,365 houses and damaged 188,830 more. Most of the damages reported were in Northern Luzon. Meanwhile, Mindoro and Panay islands were also affected as the storm-induced southwest monsoon brought rains and floods to those areas.

=== Typhoon Nakri (Enteng) ===
- Very strong typhoon (JMA)
- Category 4 typhoon (SSHWS)
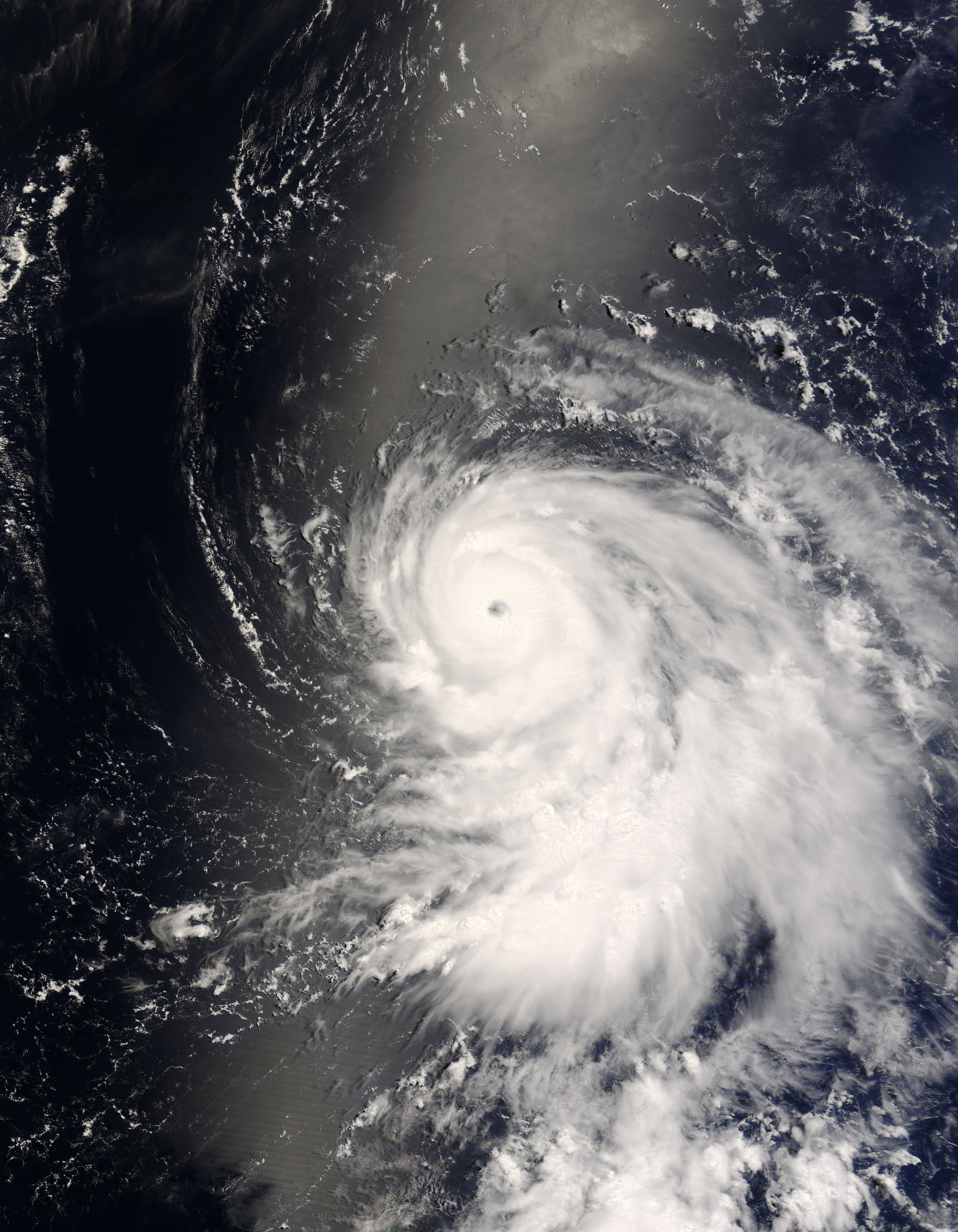
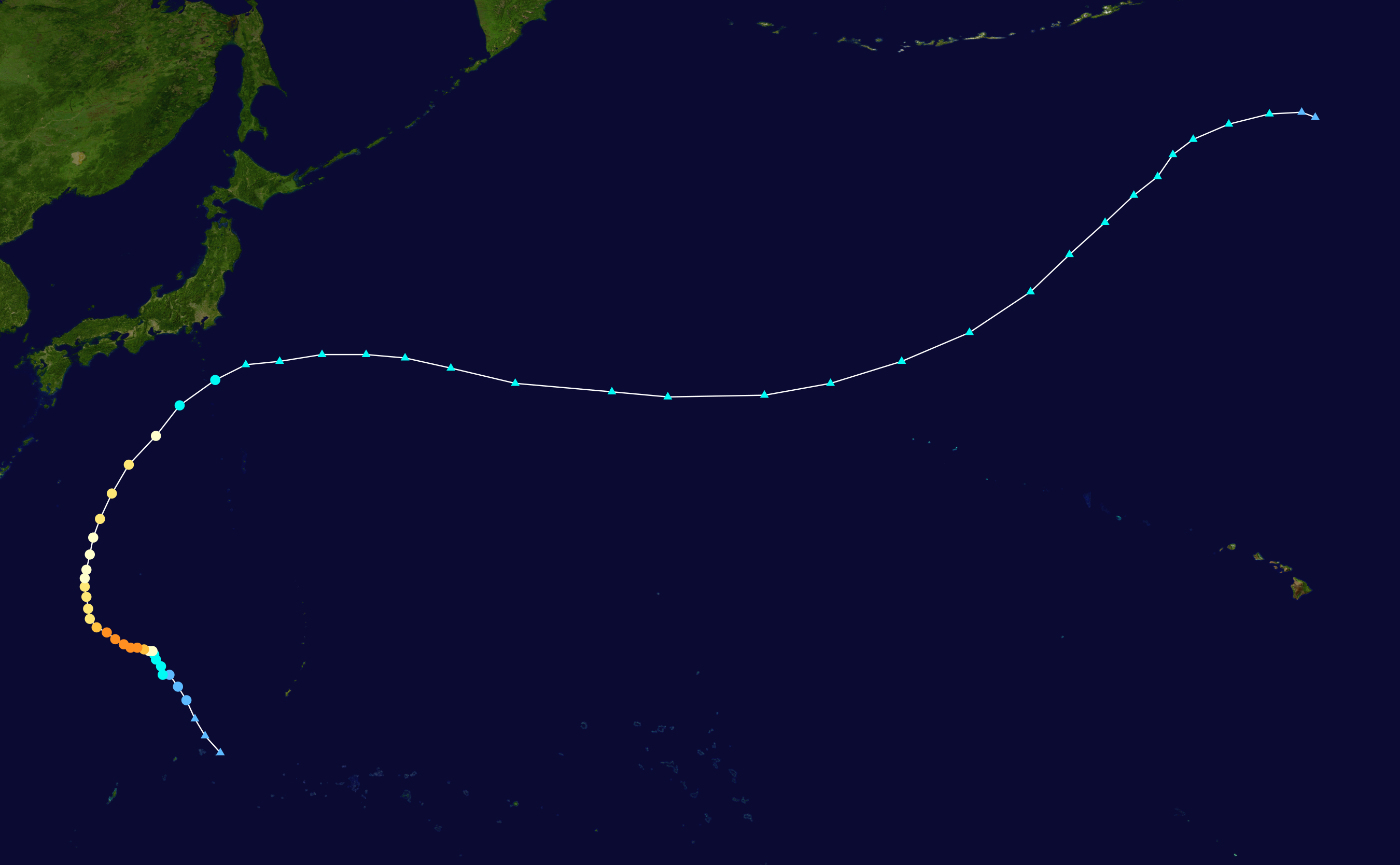
- Duration: May 26 – June 3
- Peak intensity: 185 km/h (115 mph) (10-min); 930 hPa (mbar)

A tropical disturbance formed south of Guam on May 25. On May 26, the JMA recognized it as a weak tropical depression, and later that day, the JTWC issued a TCFA on the system.

Early on May 27, the JTWC issued its first advisory on Tropical Depression 06W. Hours after, the JMA designated the system as Tropical Storm Nakri. Early on May 28, the JMA upgraded it to a severe tropical storm. Twelve hours later, the JTWC upgraded 06W to a typhoon. Later that day, Nakri strengthened at a more rapid pace and the rapid intensification continued into May 29, when Nakri strengthened to a Category 4-equivalent typhoon. PAGASA then issued its first advisory on the storm on early on May 30 and named it "Enteng". By May 31, it began to weaken as it moved north. But on the next day, it started to re-intensify slightly. On June 2, it began to undergo transition to an extratropical system. And later, both JTWC and JMA stopped issuing advisories as it already degenerated to an extratropical low.

=== Typhoon Fengshen (Frank) ===
- Very strong typhoon (JMA)
- Category 3 typhoon (SSHWS)
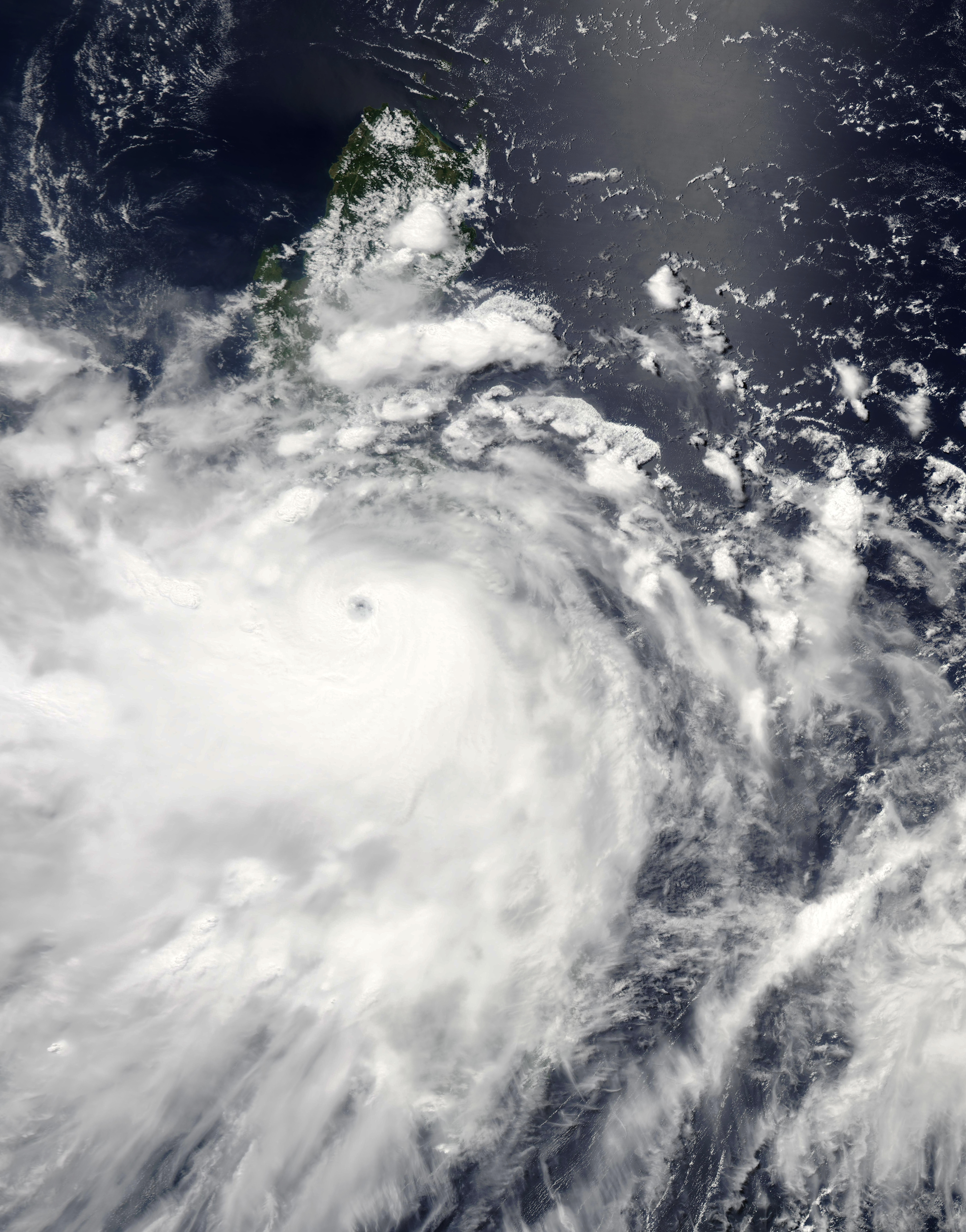
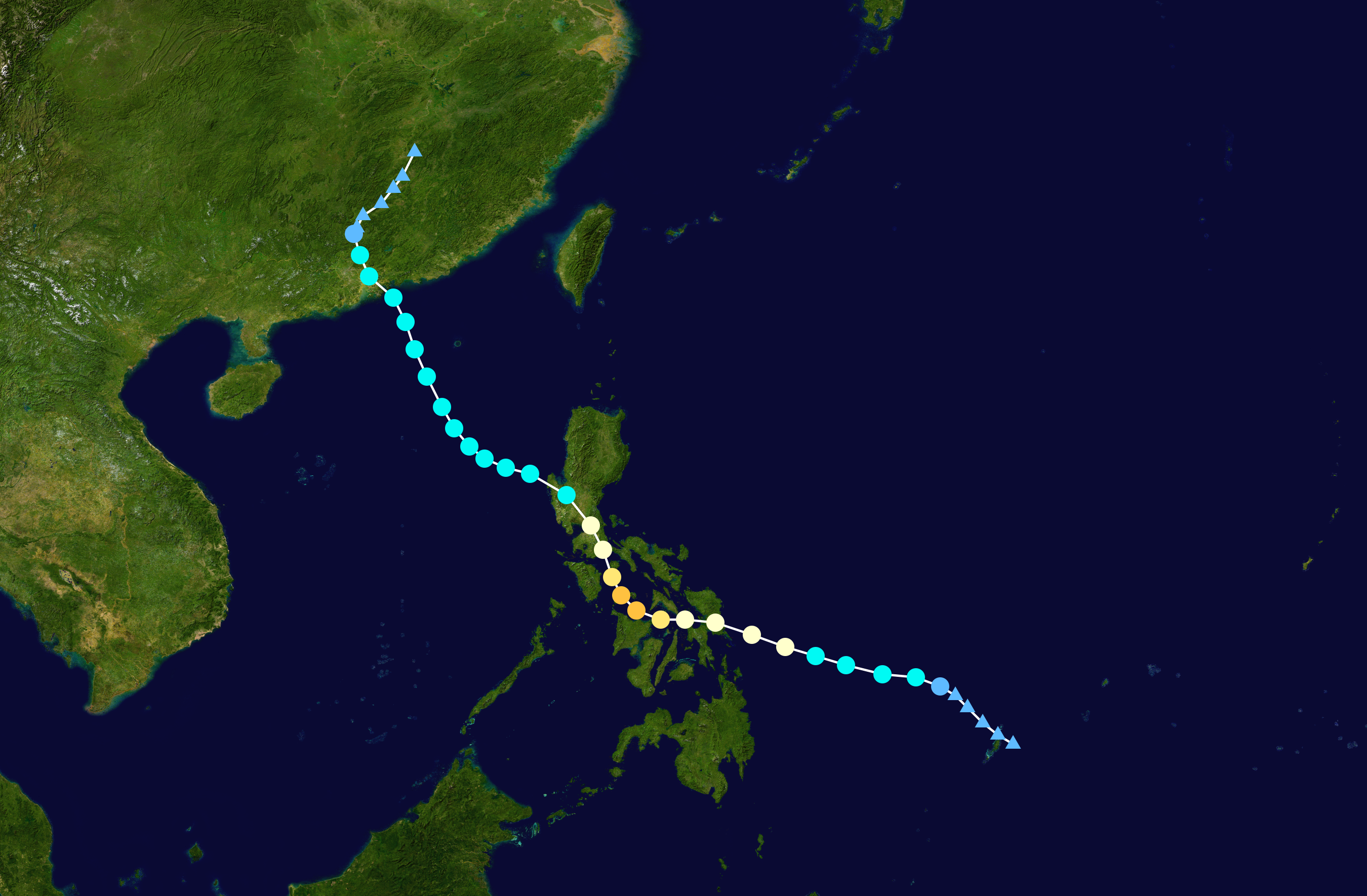
- Duration: June 17 – June 25
- Peak intensity: 165 km/h (105 mph) (10-min); 945 hPa (mbar)

On June 18, an area of low pressure that the Philippine Atmospheric, Geophysical and Astronomical Services Administration (PAGASA) had been monitoring for a few days was upgraded to Tropical Depression Frank. Later that day, both the Joint Typhoon Warning Center (JTWC) and the Japan Meteorological Agency (JMA) started issuing full advisories on Frank with the JTWC designating it as Tropical Depression 07W. Early the next day, the JMA upgraded the tropical depression to a tropical storm and assigned the name Fengshen. Fengshen then rapidly intensified that day by becoming a severe tropical storm and then intensifying into a typhoon later that day. The next day, Typhoon Fengshen made landfall in eastern Samar in the central Philippines and travelled northwest over the islands.

Fengshen was initially forecast to go through Bicol Region but later on shifted its course further westward, eventually going towards the direction of Mindoro Province. However, before even reaching Mindoro, it again shifted its direction northward towards the direction of Metro Manila, mainly because of the weakening of the High Pressure area system in the northern part of the Philippines.

Typhoon Fengshen, after creating havoc in the Philippines, emerged into the South China Sea on the 22nd of June and moved northwards towards China. After moving into the South China Sea both the JMA and PAGASA downgraded it to a severe tropical storm while the JTWC downgraded Fengshen from a Typhoon to a Tropical Storm. PAGASA then issued its final advisory on Tropical Storm Fengshen (Frank) due to Fengshen leaving PAGASA's Area of Responsibility. Late in the evening of the 24th June, Tropical Storm Fengshen made landfall on Shenzhen, Guangdong, before moving into mainland China. The next day, JTWC downgraded Fengshen to a tropical depression and issued their final warning on the system. The JMA then announced their final warning as they downgraded Fengshen to a tropical depression.

=== Tropical Depression Gener ===
- Tropical depression (JMA)
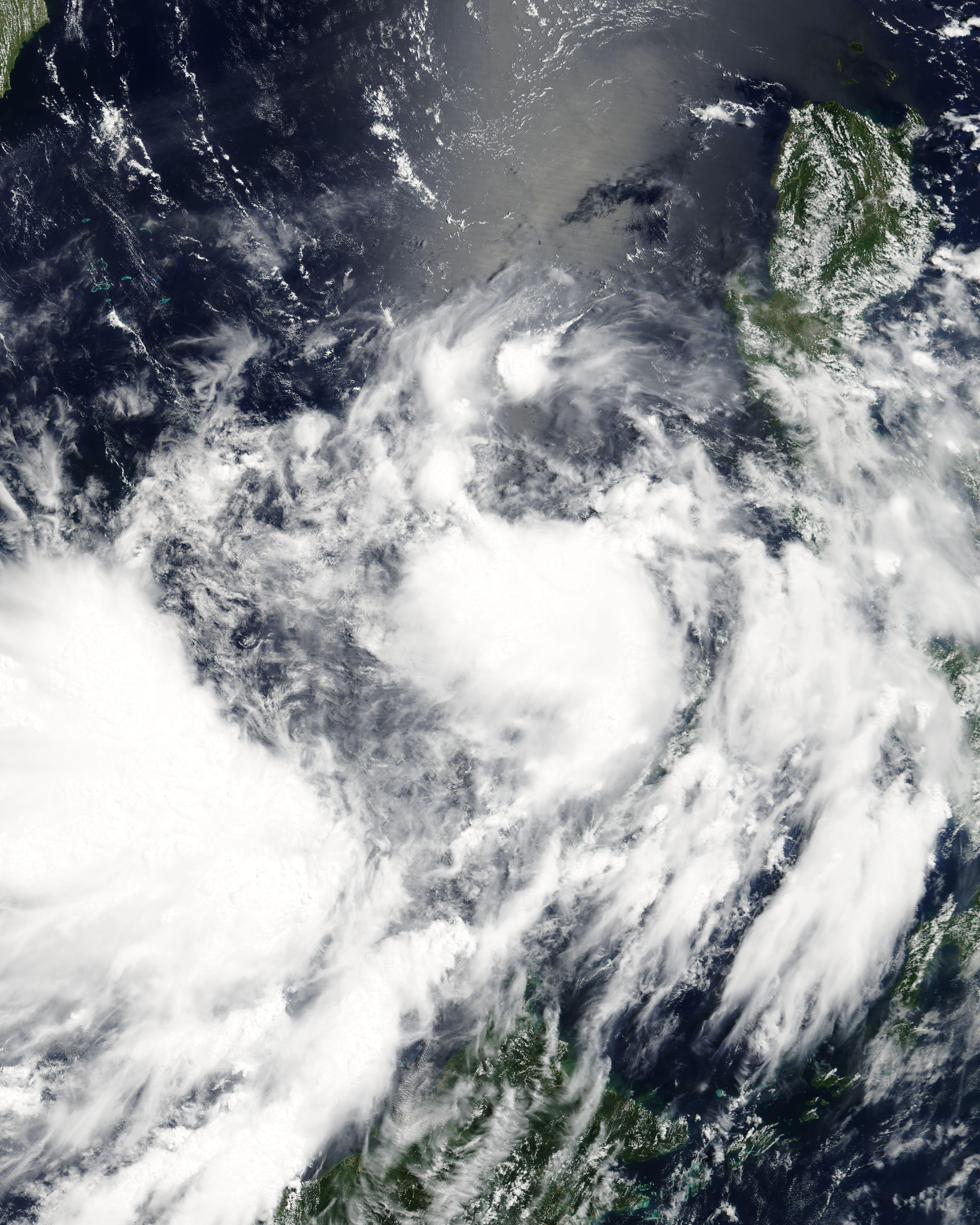
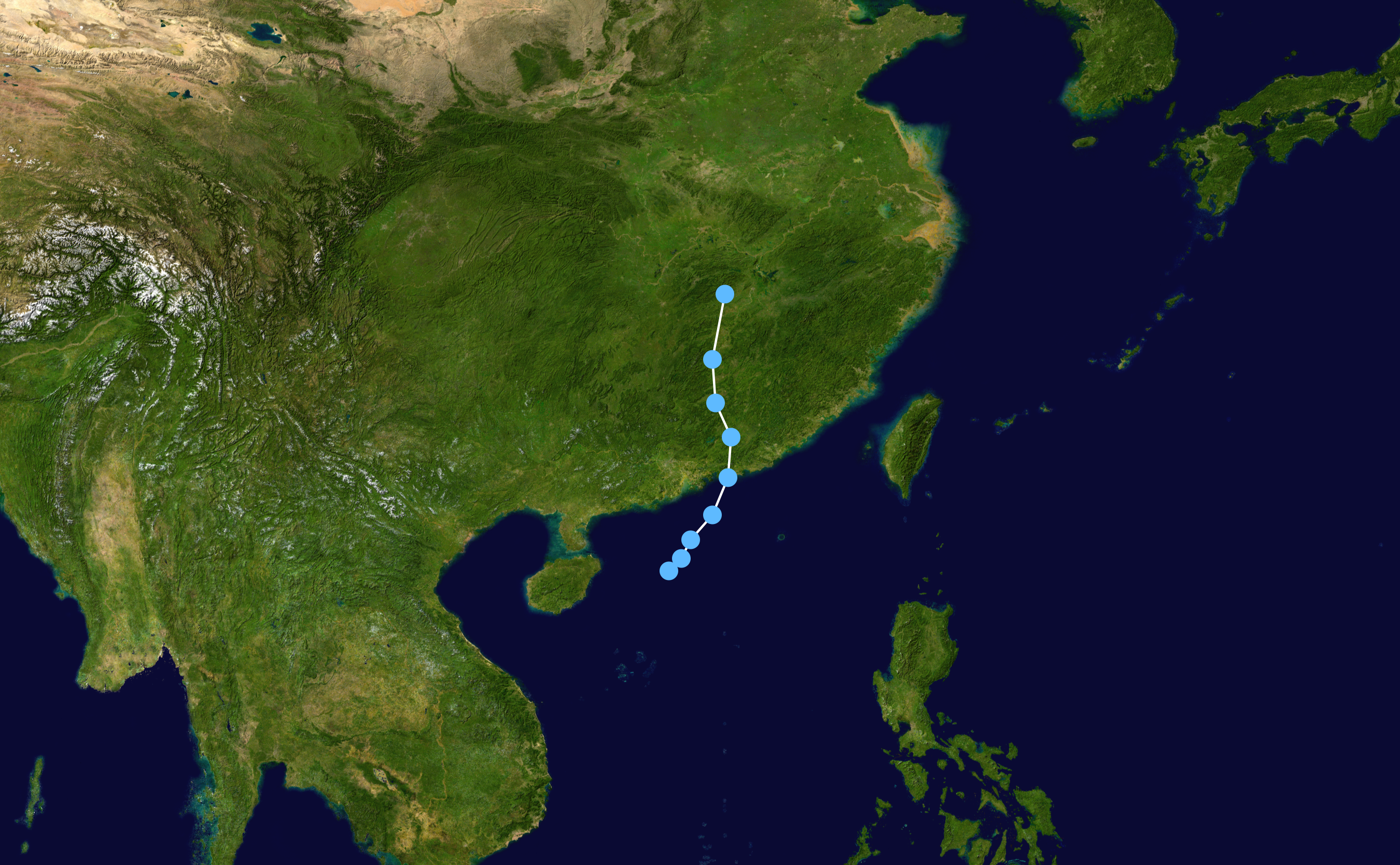
- Duration: July 4 – July 8
- Peak intensity: 55 km/h (35 mph) (10-min); 1000 hPa (mbar)

On July 4, PAGASA reported that Tropical Depression Gener formed in the South China Sea to the west of the Philippines. The precursor to Gener earlier moved across Luzon, producing 13 mm (0.51 in) of rain in the Ilocos Region. The system had deep convection persisting on the western side of its developing low level circulation center, although it was in an area of moderate wind shear, and rapid development was not expected. On July 7, Gener left the PAGASA area of responsibility. The Joint Typhoon Warning Center (JTWC) issued a Tropical Cyclone Formation Alert on July 7 as the circulation strengthened, despite the convection being disorganized due to the shear. Later that day the JMA reported that the system become a minor Tropical Depression, although the Hong Kong Observatory (HKO) did not follow suit. The system rapidly weakened as it moved ashore on China to the east of Hong Kong. Early on July 8, the JMA issued their last advisory on the depression. There was no damage reported in China, although the system produced heavy rainfall in Guangdong Province.

=== Typhoon Kalmaegi (Helen) ===
- Typhoon (JMA)
- Category 2 typhoon (SSHWS)
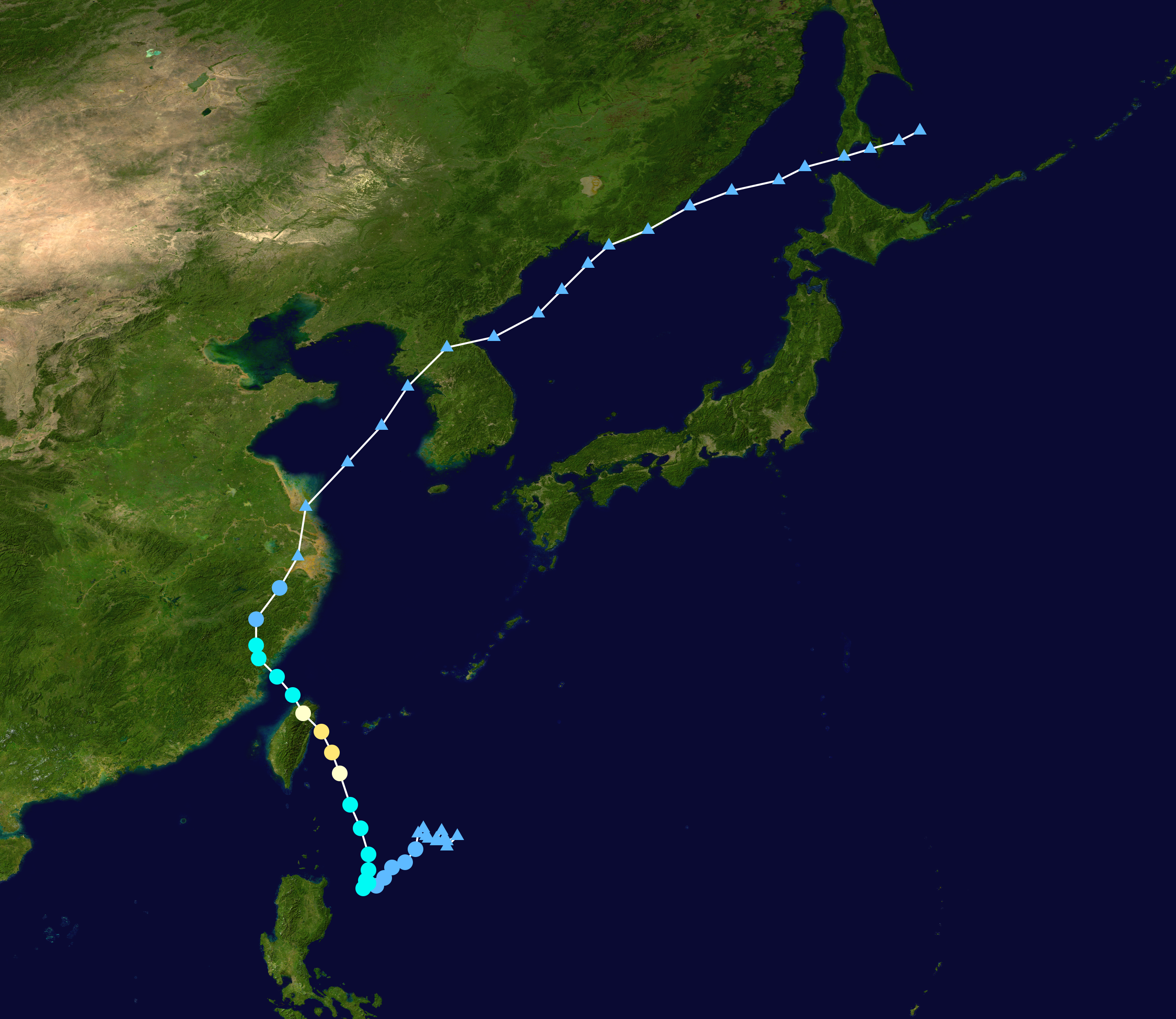
- Duration: July 13 – July 20
- Peak intensity: 120 km/h (75 mph) (10-min); 970 hPa (mbar)

Early on July 13, the Japan Meteorological Agency (JMA) began issuing advisories on a tropical depression east of the Philippines. Later that day, PAGASA named the system Helen, and the next day the Joint Typhoon Warning Center (JTWC) designated it Tropical Depression 08W. On July 15, both the JTWC and JMA upgraded it to a tropical storm and the JMA named it Kalmaegi. By early July 17, Kalmaegi rapidly intensified into a typhoon. The storm then crossed northern Luzon, particularly the Ilocos Region and Cagayan Valley, killing two people and affecting more than 31,000 residents while causing about ₱7 million in property damage. It later made landfall in Yilan County in northeastern Taiwan on July 17 and emerged into the Taiwan Strait the next morning. The storm killed at least 19 people, produced over 1,100 mm of rain in parts of Tainan County (now part of Tainan City), and caused about NT$300 million in damage, including major agricultural losses.

After crossing Taiwan, Kalmaegi weakened to a tropical storm and made landfall in Xiapu County in Fujian Province with winds of about 90 miles per hour (140 km/h). About 360,000 residents evacuated in Fujian Province and Zhejiang Province. Early on July 19, the JTWC issued its final advisory as the storm weakened to a tropical depression, while the JMA continued monitoring it until it became an extratropical cyclone over North Korea the following day.

=== Typhoon Fung-wong (Igme) ===
- Typhoon (JMA)
- Category 2 typhoon (SSHWS)
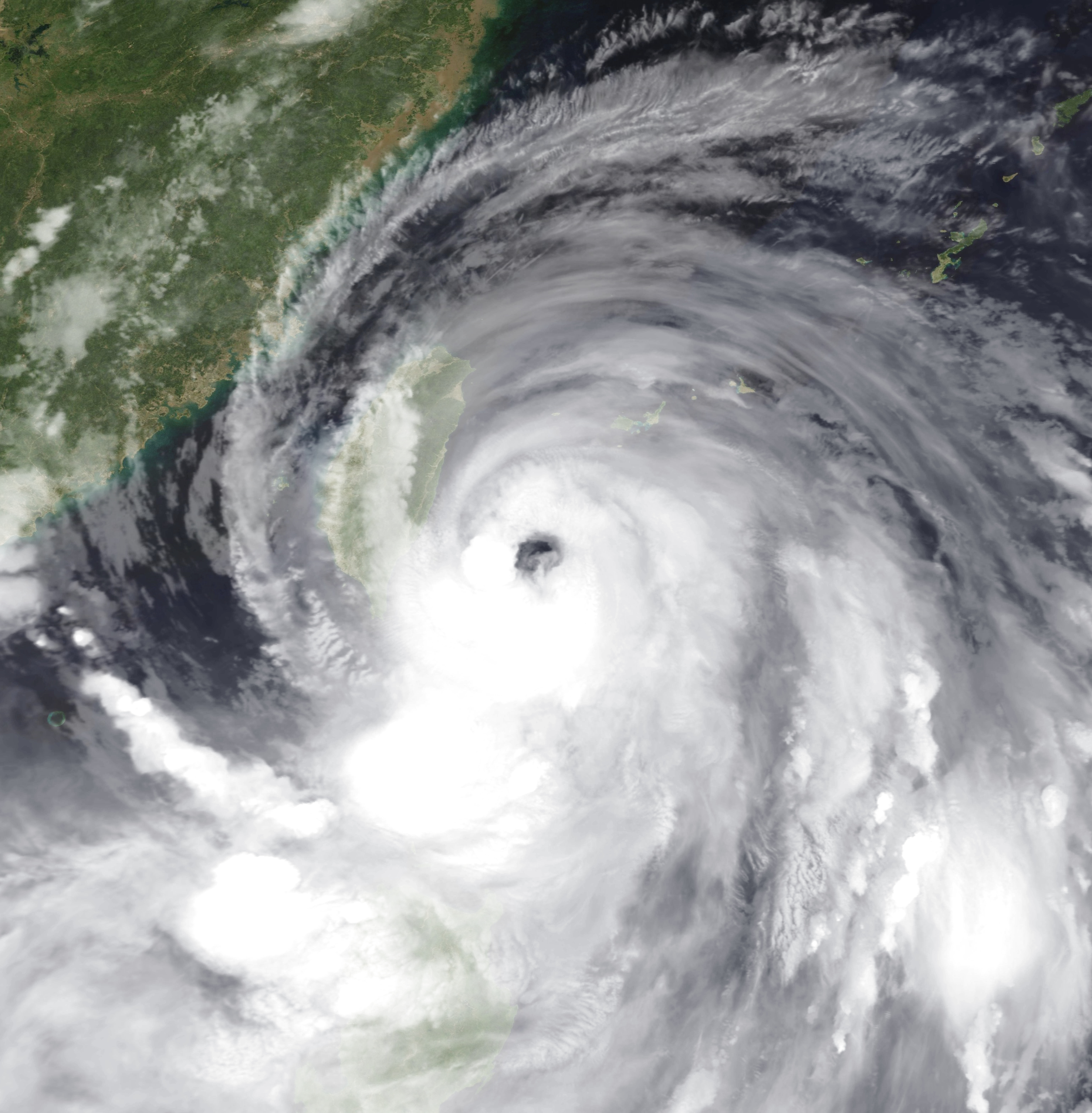
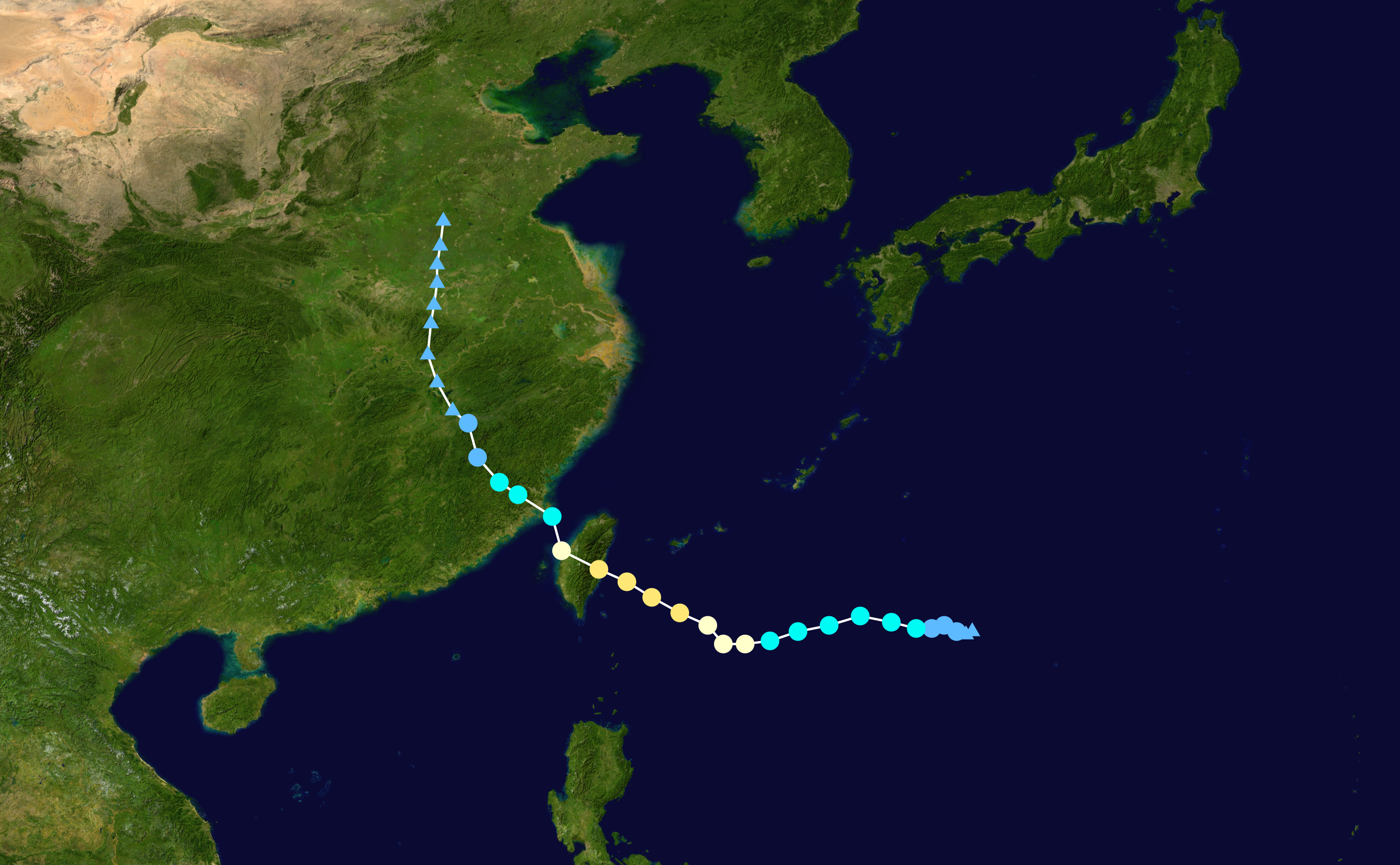
- Duration: July 23 – July 30
- Peak intensity: 140 km/h (85 mph) (10-min); 960 hPa (mbar)

On July 23, the Japan Meteorological Agency (JMA) began issuing WWJP25 warnings for a minor tropical depression located east of the Philippines. Early the next day, PAGASA named the system Igme. Shortly afterward, the Joint Typhoon Warning Center (JTWC) began issuing advisories, designating it as Tropical Depression 09W. Later that day, the JMA started issuing full advisories, while the JTWC upgraded the system to a tropical storm. The JMA subsequently named it Tropical Storm Fung-wong on July 25. Fung-wong continued to intensify, becoming a severe tropical storm on the morning of July 26. Later that day, both the JTWC and PAGASA upgraded it to a typhoon, although the JMA did not do so until early the following day. Late on July 27, Fung-wong reached peak winds of 95 kn (109 mph; 176 km/h), equivalent to a strong Category 2 typhoon on the Saffir–Simpson scale. It later made landfall in Taiwan near the border of Hualien County and Taitung County as a typhoon. PAGASA then issued its final advisory as the storm moved out of its area of responsibility.

Early on July 28, Fung-wong emerged into the Taiwan Strait from Changhua County, having weakened to a severe tropical storm, while the JTWC downgraded it to a tropical storm. The system later made a second landfall over mainland China, after which the JTWC issued its final warning. The JMA continued issuing advisories, downgrading Fung-wong to a tropical storm on July 29. Later that day, the JMA ended full advisories as the system weakened into a tropical depression, though it continued monitoring the depression in its WWJP25 warnings until issuing its final warning the following day.

=== Severe Tropical Storm Kammuri (Julian) ===
- Severe tropical storm (JMA)
- Tropical storm (SSHWS)
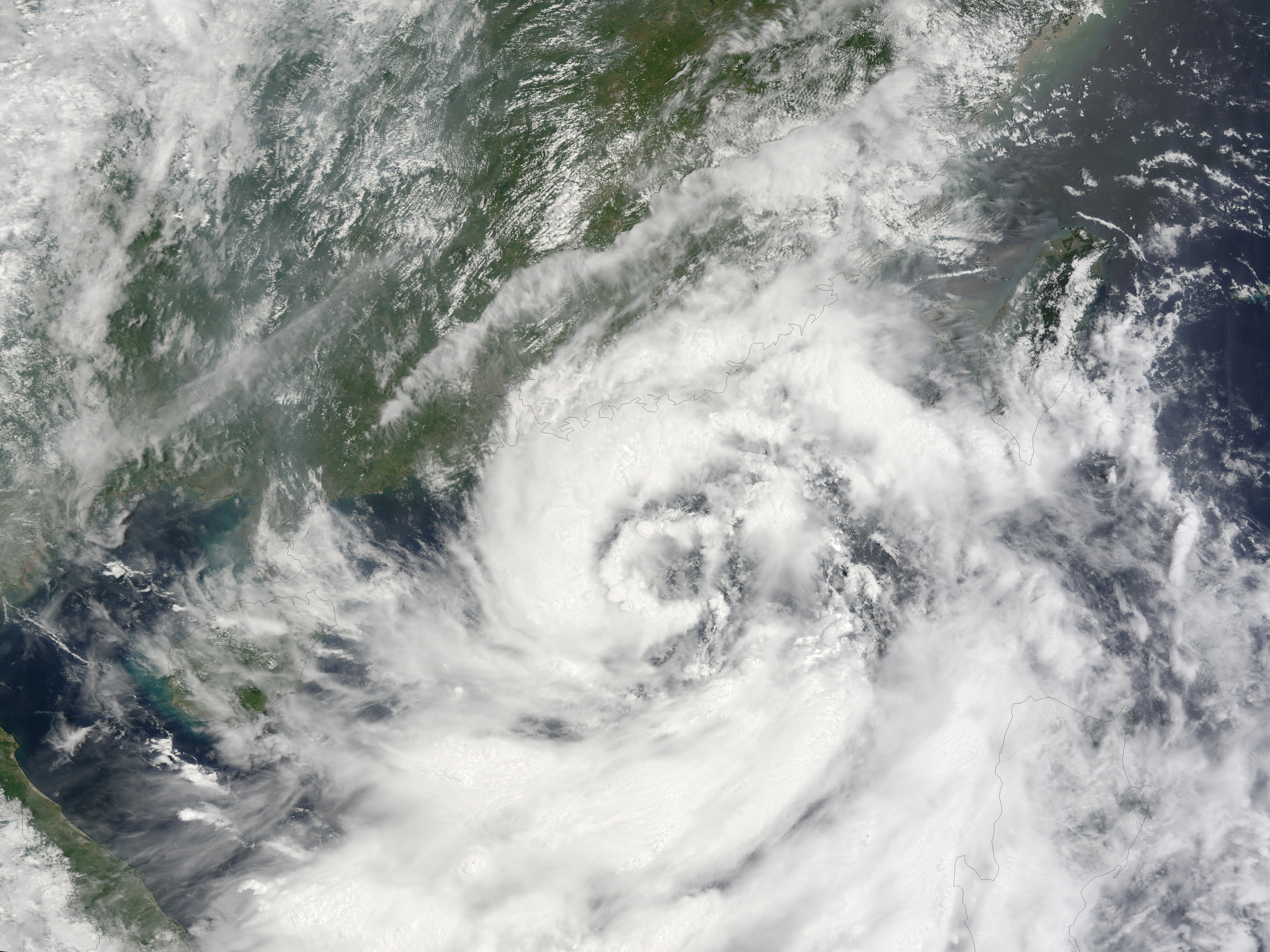
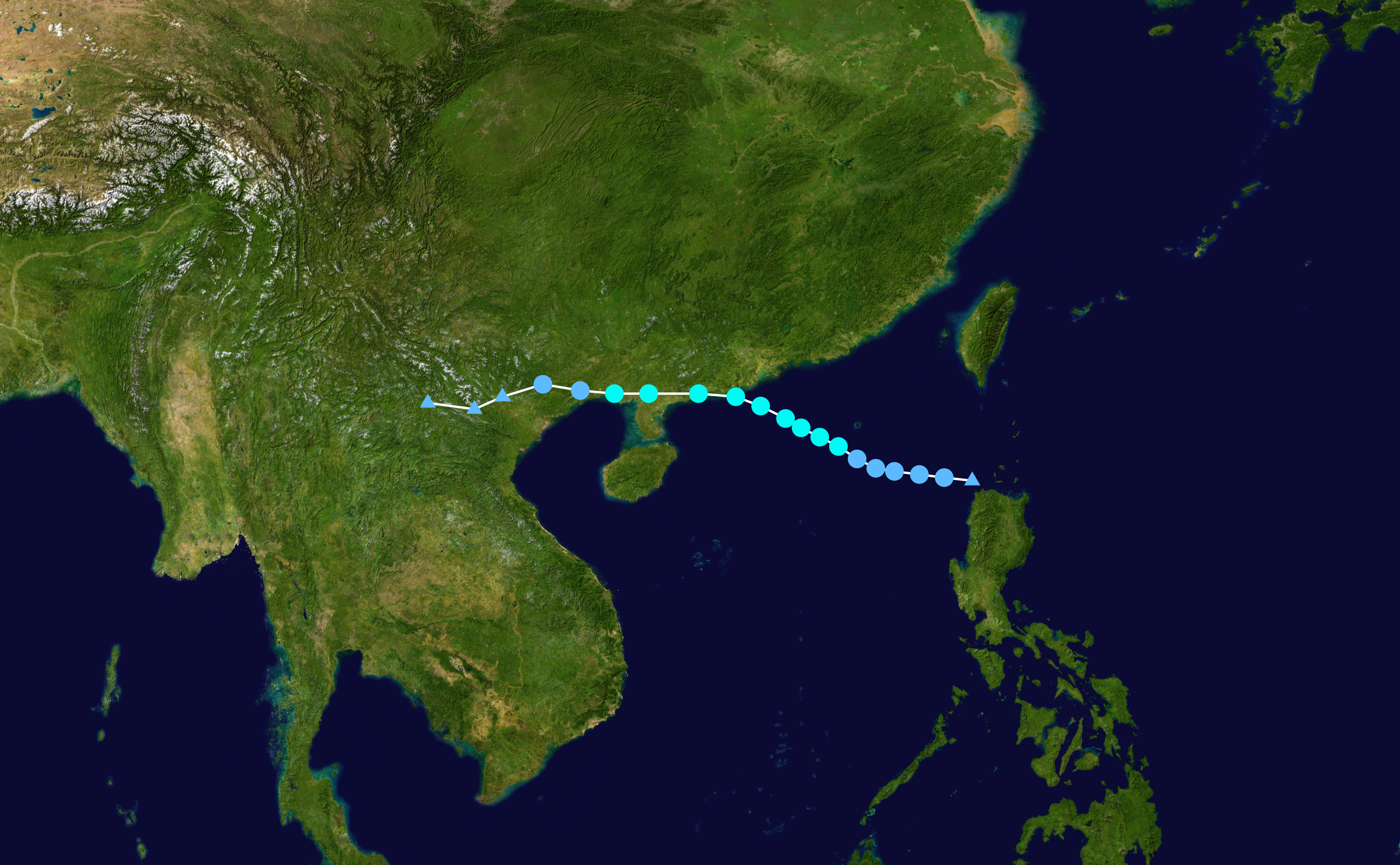
- Duration: August 3 – August 8
- Peak intensity: 95 km/h (60 mph) (10-min); 975 hPa (mbar)

On August 3 at 1500 UTC, PAGASA identified a tropical disturbance located to the north of Luzon island in the Philippines, designating it as Tropical Depression Julian. Later that day, the Japan Meteorological Agency (JMA) designated Julian as a minor tropical depression and initiated advisories on the depression.

Early the next day, the JMA started to issue full advisories on the depression, with the Joint Typhoon Warning Center (JTWC) starting to issue warnings on it, designating it as Tropical Depression 10W. Furthermore, both PAGASA and the JTWC upgraded the Tropical Depression to a Tropical Storm. On August 5, RSMC Tokyo upgraded the depression to a Tropical Storm and named it Kammuri. PAGASA then released their last advisory on Kammuri as it moved out of PAGASA's Area of Responsibility and headed towards Mainland China. The Hong Kong Observatory then upgraded Kammuri to a Severe Tropical Storm, with the JMA upgrading it to a severe tropical storm early the next morning.

However, Kammuri started to weaken after making landfall along the south coast of China in the Western Guangdong Province at about 12pm UTC on August 6. After Kammuri had made landfall, the JMA downgraded Kammuri to a tropical storm, whilst the JTWC issued their final advisory later that day on Tropical Storm Kammuri. Early the next day, Kammuri emerged into the Gulf of Tonkin. However, later that day, Kammuri made landfall again in the Guangxi Province of China. After making landfall, Kammuri weakened to a tropical depression as the JMA issued its last advisory on August 7. The JMA continued to monitor the depression in their WWJP25 warnings until early on August 8.

=== Severe Tropical Storm Phanfone ===
- Severe tropical storm (JMA)
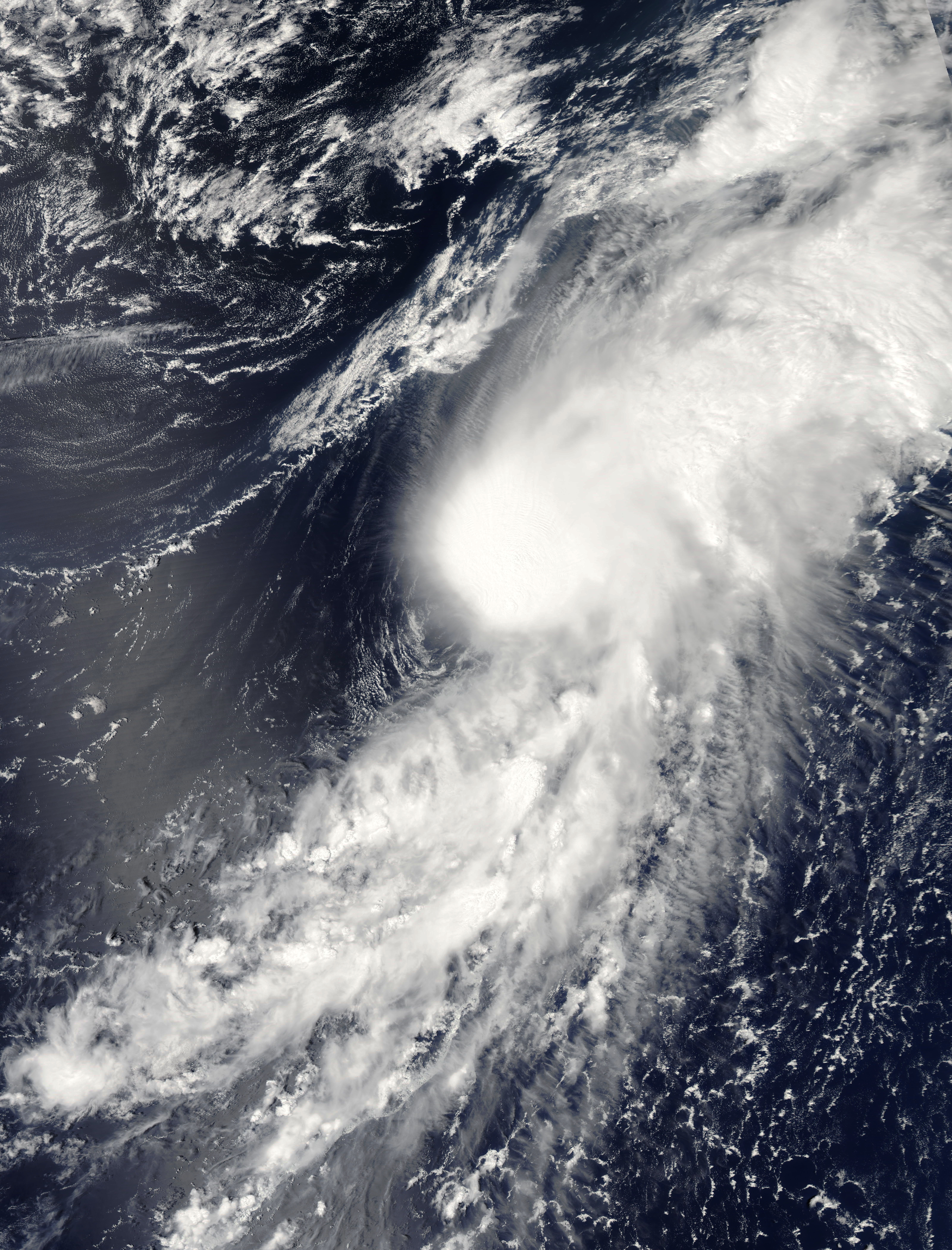
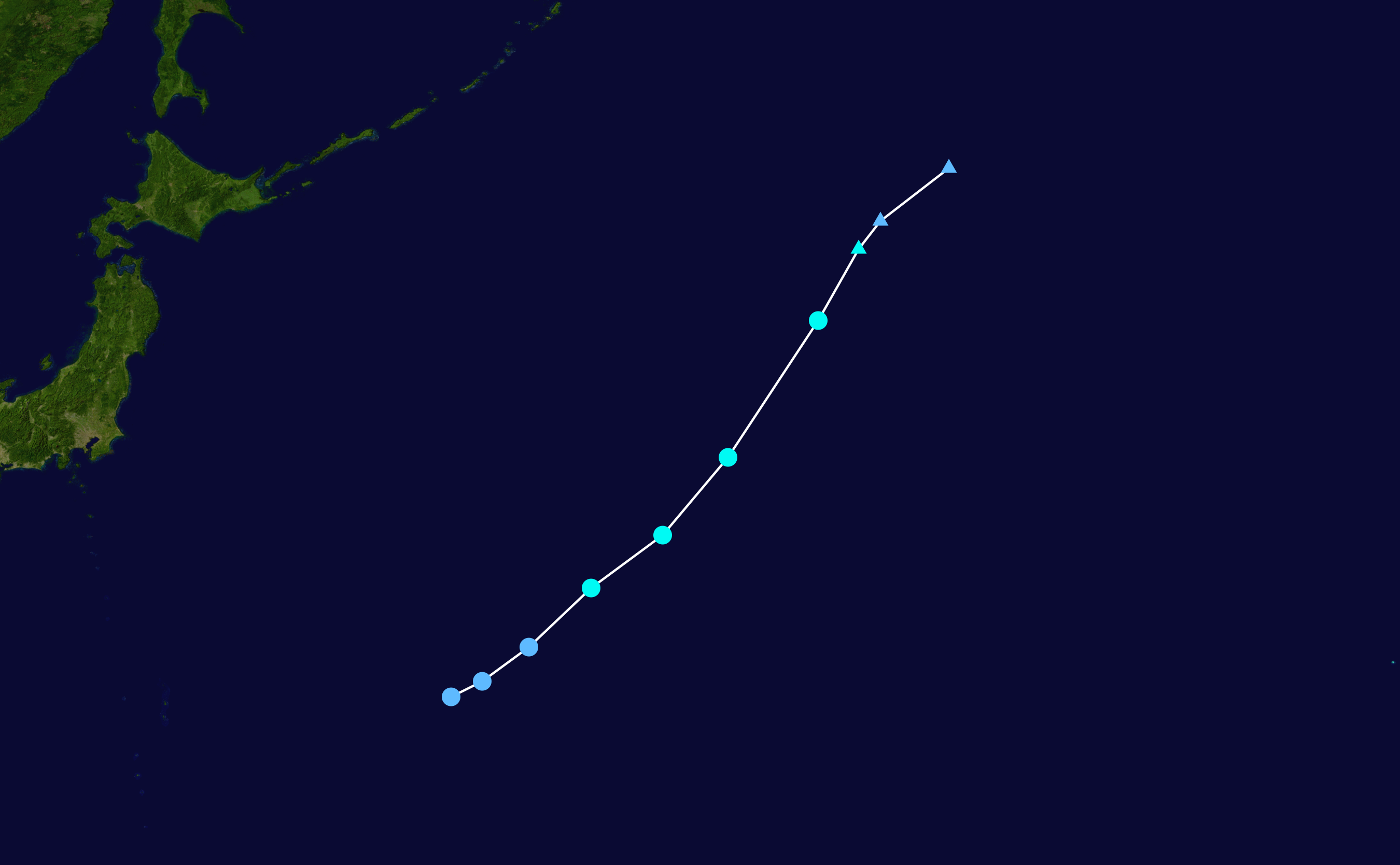
- Duration: August 9 – August 11
- Peak intensity: 95 km/h (60 mph) (10-min); 996 hPa (mbar)

Late on August 9, the Japan Meteorological Agency (JMA) started to issue full advisories on a tropical depression which was located southeast of Japan. Early the next day, the depression intensified into a tropical storm and was named Phanfone by the JMA as it moved northwards. Late on August 10, Phanfone reached its maximum wind speeds of 40 knots (74 km/h; 46 mph) as it was becoming extratropical. Early the next day, Phanfone became an extratropical low as the JMA issued their final advisory.

Phanfone was upgraded to a severe tropical storm in post-storm analysis.

=== Tropical Depression 11W ===
- Tropical depression (JMA)
- Tropical storm (SSHWS)
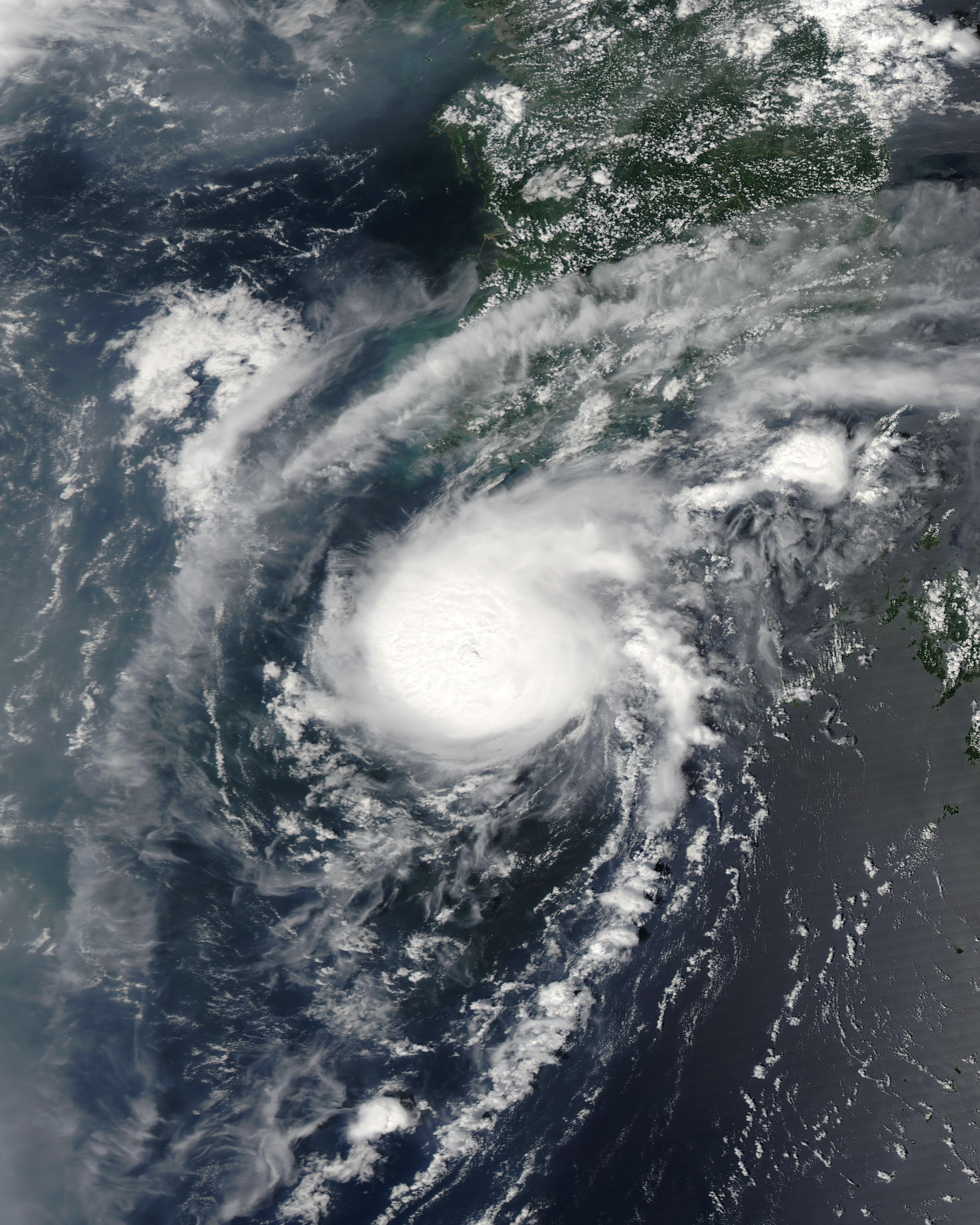
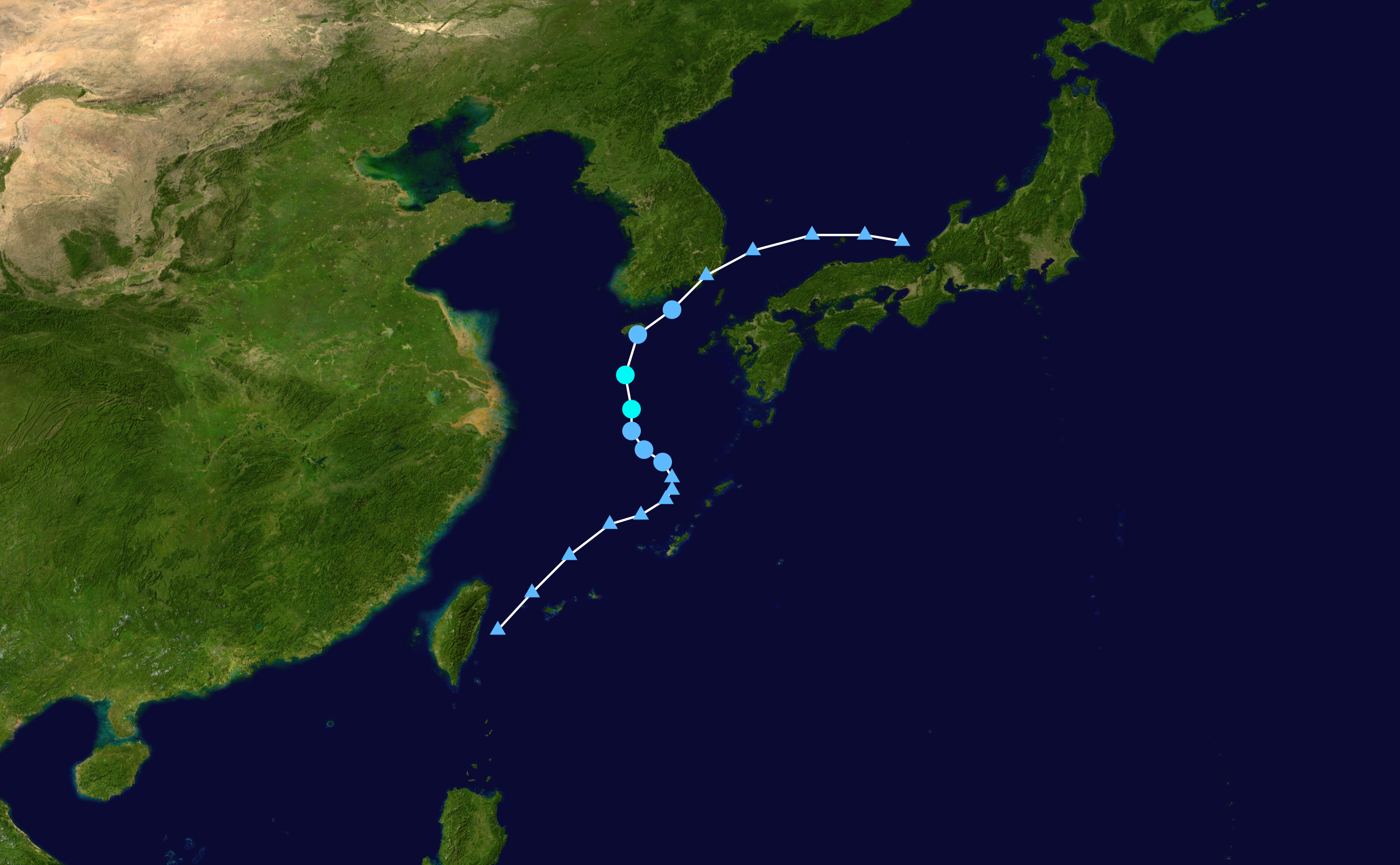
- Duration: August 12 – August 15
- Peak intensity: 55 km/h (35 mph) (10-min); 998 hPa (mbar)

Early on August 12, the JMA identified a weak tropical depression which was located to the northwest of the Ryukyu Islands, and initiated warnings on it. Early the next day, the Joint Typhoon Warning Center initiated warnings on the depression, designating it as Tropical Depression 11W. Early the next day, as Tropical Depression 11W approached Korea, the depression reached its maximum wind speeds of 30 knots (56 km/h; 35 mph). However, later that day, the JTWC issued its final advisory as due to land interaction the depressions wind speeds would weaken to below warning level. The next day, JMA released their final advisory on the depression.

=== Severe Tropical Storm Vongfong ===
- Severe tropical storm (JMA)
- Tropical storm (SSHWS)
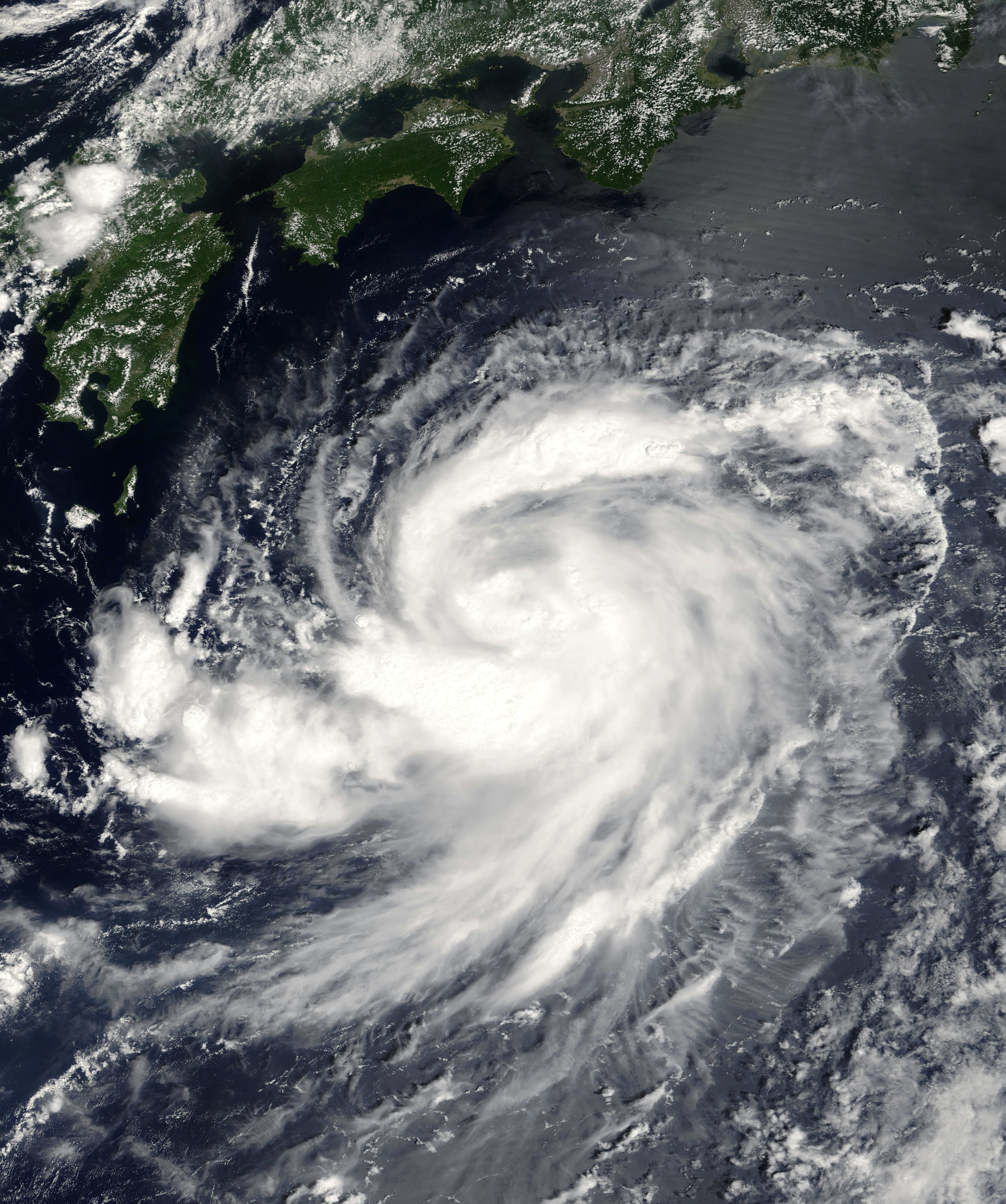
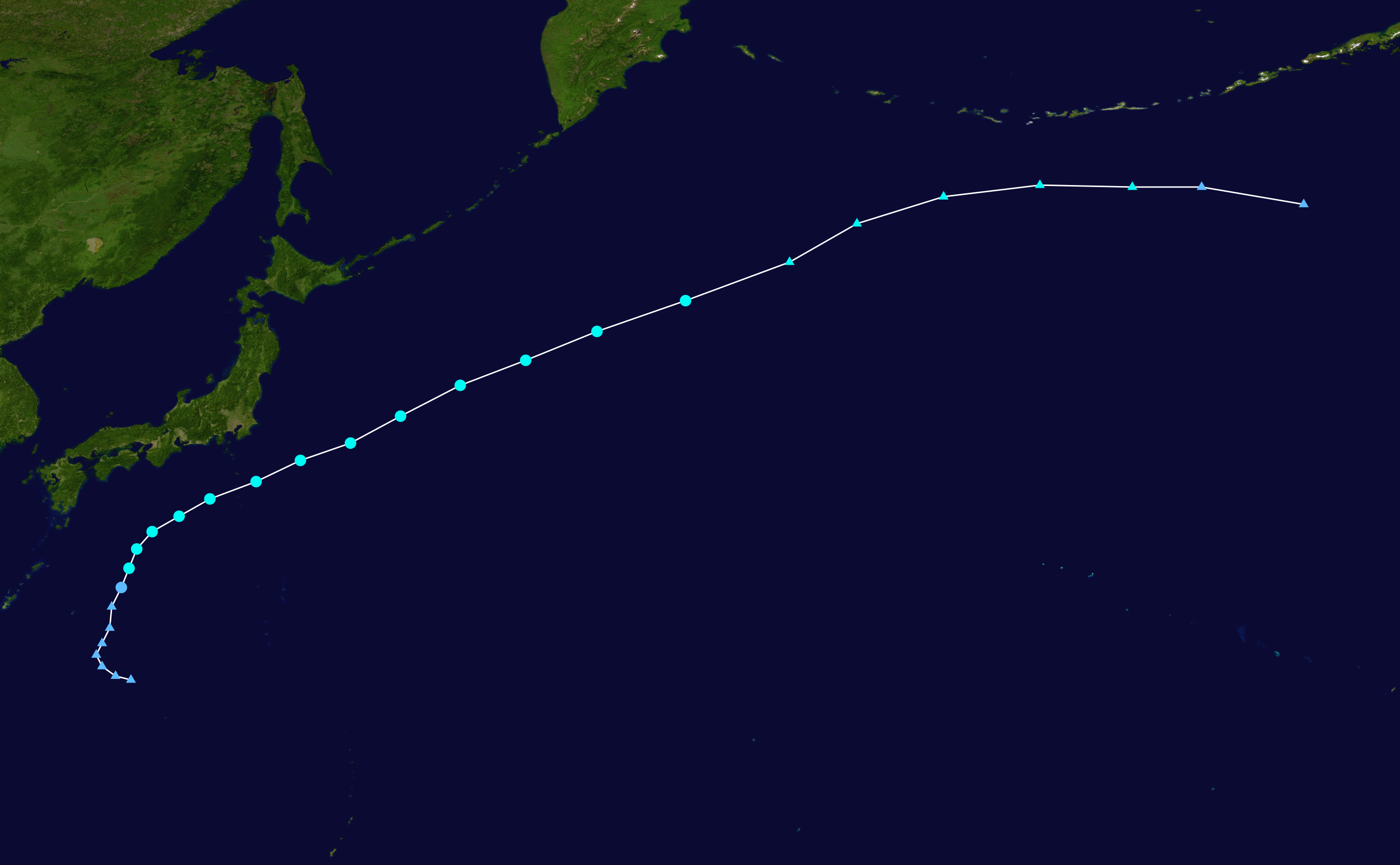
- Duration: August 14 – August 17
- Peak intensity: 95 km/h (60 mph) (10-min); 990 hPa (mbar)

Early on August 13, the Joint Typhoon Warning Center, noted that an area of convection had persisted approximately 370 nautical miles (690 km) to the southeast of Okinawa, Japan and designated it as a tropical disturbance. The JTWC at this time also assessed the disturbances chances of forming into a significant tropical cyclone within 24 hours as fair. This was due to the tropical disturbance having a broad Low Level Circulation Center with the strongest winds displaced on the eastern side of the disturbance. Early the next morning, the JTWC reassessed the disturbances chances of forming into a significant tropical cyclone within 24 hours as good and issued a Tropical Cyclone Formation Alert on the developing disturbance. This was because the Low Level Circulation Center had become well defined.

Later on August 14, the Japan Meteorological Agency designated the tropical disturbance as a minor tropical depression whilst the JTWC also upgraded the disturbance and designated it as Tropical Depression 12W. Early the next day, the JMA designated the depression as a full tropical depression, whilst the JTWC upgraded the depression to a tropical storm. Later that day, the JMA upgraded the depression into a tropical storm, assigning it the name Vongfong. JTWC then reported that Vongfong had reached its peak winds of 50 knots (58 mph; 93 km/h)1-Min) while it was located approximately 390 nautical miles (720 km) to the southwest of Tokyo, Japan. The JMA also then reported that Vongfong had reached its operational peak winds of 40 knots (46 mph; 74 km/h) 10-Min). However, this was later revised in its best track when the JMA upgraded Vongfong peak winds to 50 knots (58 mph; 93 km/h) 10-Min). Later on August 15, the JTWC reported that Vongfong had started to weaken from its peak. During the next day, Vongfong carried on weakening. The JTWC then issued its final warning on Vongfong later that day as it had begun its extratropical transition. JMA kept issuing warnings on Vongfong until early on August 17, when they downgraded it to an extratropical low. The extratropical low then crossed the International Date Line and moved out of the JMA's area of responsibility and moved into the Central Pacific Hurricane Center's area of responsibility, but they did not issue any warnings on Vongfong as it was extratropical.

As Vongfong brushed by Japan, heavy rains triggered flood, which killed one person. A total of 523 homes and 39 hectares (96.3 acres) were damaged by the storm and 15,520 people were left without power. The storm also damaged 139 roads and caused 54 landslides.

=== Typhoon Nuri (Karen) ===
- Typhoon (JMA)
- Category 3 typhoon (SSHWS)
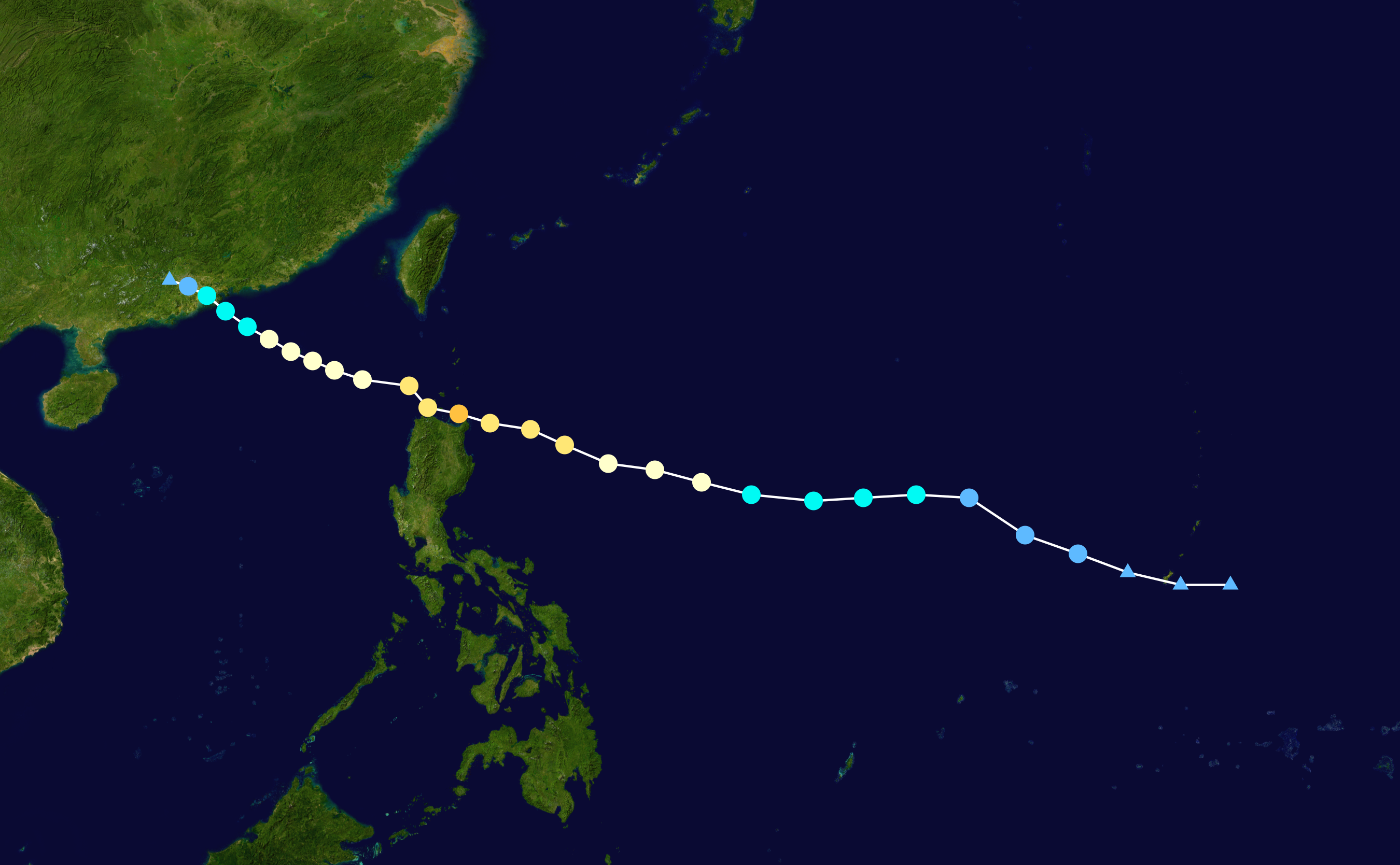
- Duration: August 17 – August 23
- Peak intensity: 140 km/h (85 mph) (10-min); 955 hPa (mbar)

On August 17, JTWC identified a tropical depression located to the east of the Philippines, designating it as 13W. Later that day, both the JMA and PAGASA identified the tropical depression, starting to issue full advisories on the depression with PAGASA naming it Karen. Later that day, the JTWC upgraded Karen to a Tropical Storm.

The next day, both PAGASA and the JMA upgraded the depression to a Tropical Storm with RSMC Tokyo naming it as Nuri. It then intensified rather quickly with the JMA designating it as a Severe Tropical Storm with the JMA, PAGASA, and the JTWC upgrading Nuri to a Typhoon later that day. Late on August 19, Typhoon Nuri made landfall on the Philippines and then over the next day, it moved across northern Luzon, causing 12 deaths and 461.3 million PHP in damage. On that day, Nuri entered the Babuyan Channel and started to move northwestwards towards Hong Kong and China. On August 21, PAGASA then issued its final advisory on Nuri as it was moving out of PAGASA's Area of Responsibility. The JMA then downgraded Nuri to a severe tropical storm, with the JTWC also downgrading Nuri to a tropical storm later as it was approaching Hong Kong. However, the JMA did not downgrade Nuri to a tropical storm until the next morning after Nuri had made a rare direct hit on Hong Kong. The JTWC then issued its final advisory later on Nuri, with the JMA then downgrading Nuri to a weak tropical depression early the next day and issued its last full advisory on Nuri as it was just moving into mainland China.

=== Tropical Depression 14W (Lawin) ===
- Tropical depression (JMA)
- Tropical storm (SSHWS)
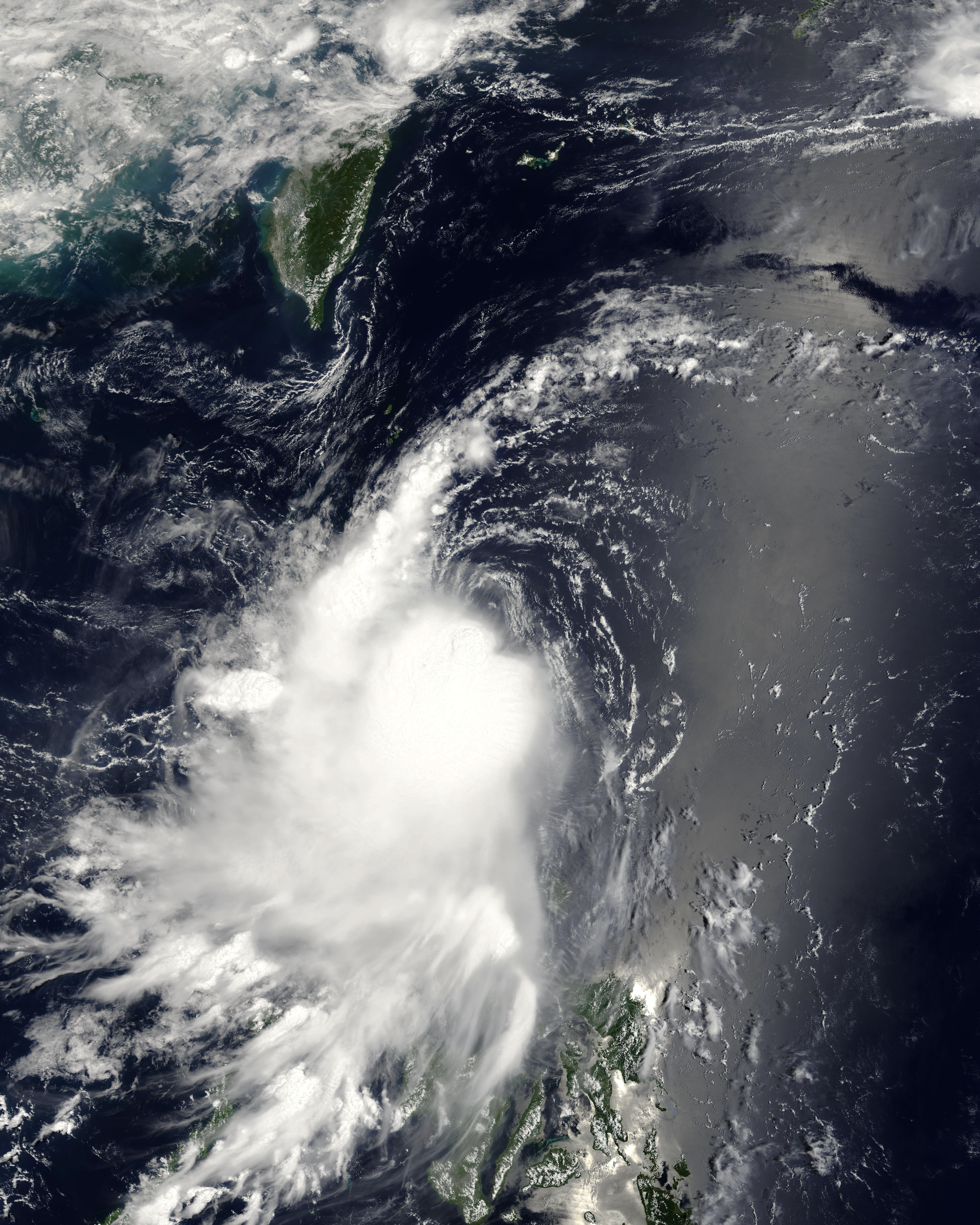
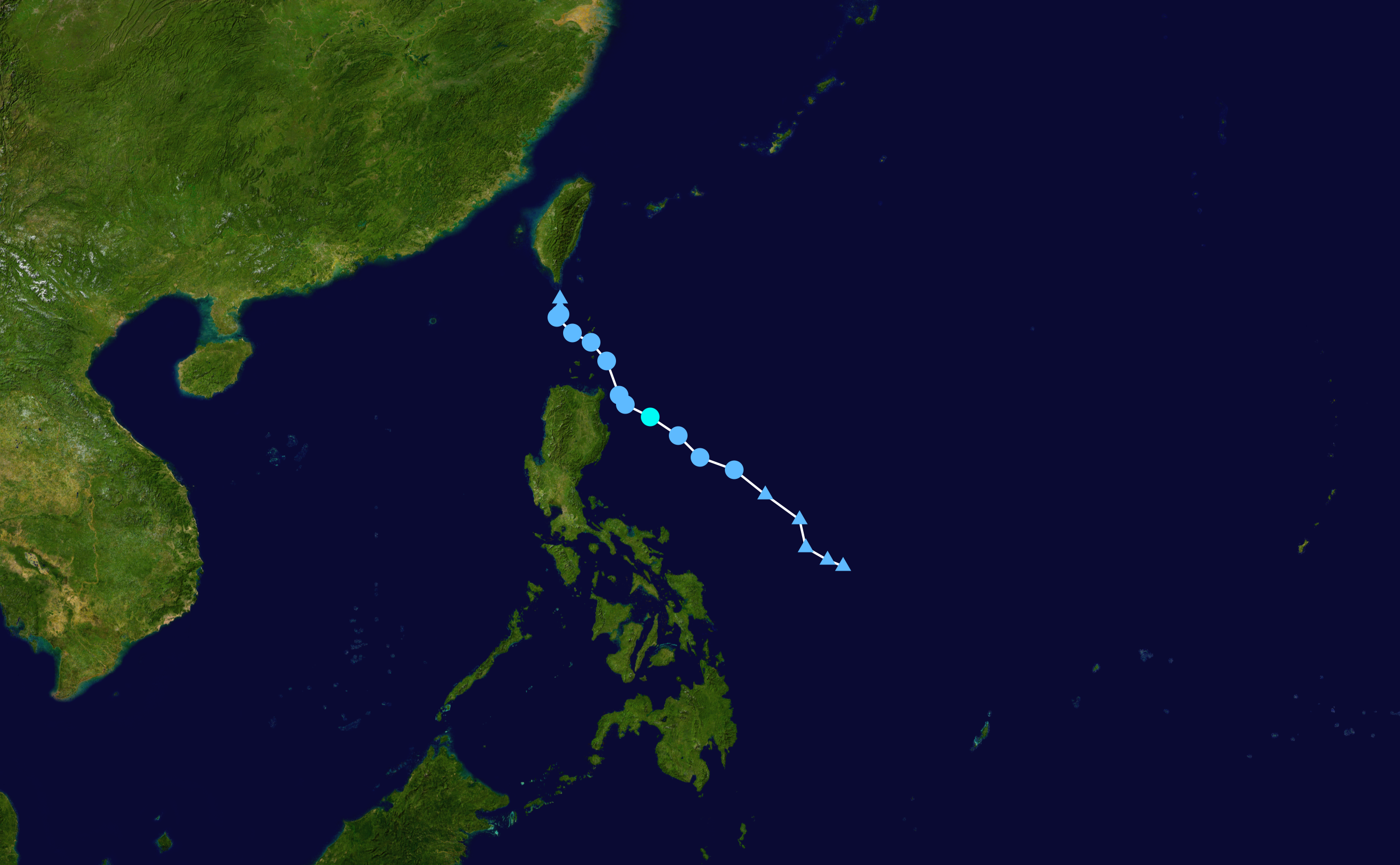
- Duration: August 26 – August 28
- Peak intensity: 55 km/h (35 mph) (10-min); 1002 hPa (mbar)

On August 24, a tropical disturbance formed to the east of Luzon in the Philippines. Early the next day, PAGASA designated it as Tropical Depression Lawin. However, the JMA did not designate it as a minor tropical depression until early on August 26, with the JTWC issuing a Tropical Cyclone Formation Alert at the same time. PAGASA then hoisted Public storm Signal number 1 for parts of Luzon which meant that wind speeds of 30–60 km/h were expected within 36 hours in the warning areas. Later that day, both the JMA and the JTWC started to issue full advisories on the tropical depression, with the JTWC designating it as Tropical Depression 14W. Early the next day, the JTWC upgraded the tropical depression to a tropical storm, but neither the JMA nor PAGASA upgraded the depression to a tropical storm at this time (or at any time during Lawin's existence). The JTWC then weakened the cyclone back into a tropical depression within their next advisory. The JMA then terminated issuing full advisories later that day as it was no longer expected to develop into a tropical storm. On August 28, the JTWC issued its final advisory on the Tropical depression followed by the JMA and PAGASA later that day. There were no reported casualties from Tropical Depression 14W (Lawin).

=== Typhoon Sinlaku (Marce) ===
- Very strong typhoon (JMA)
- Category 4 typhoon (SSHWS)
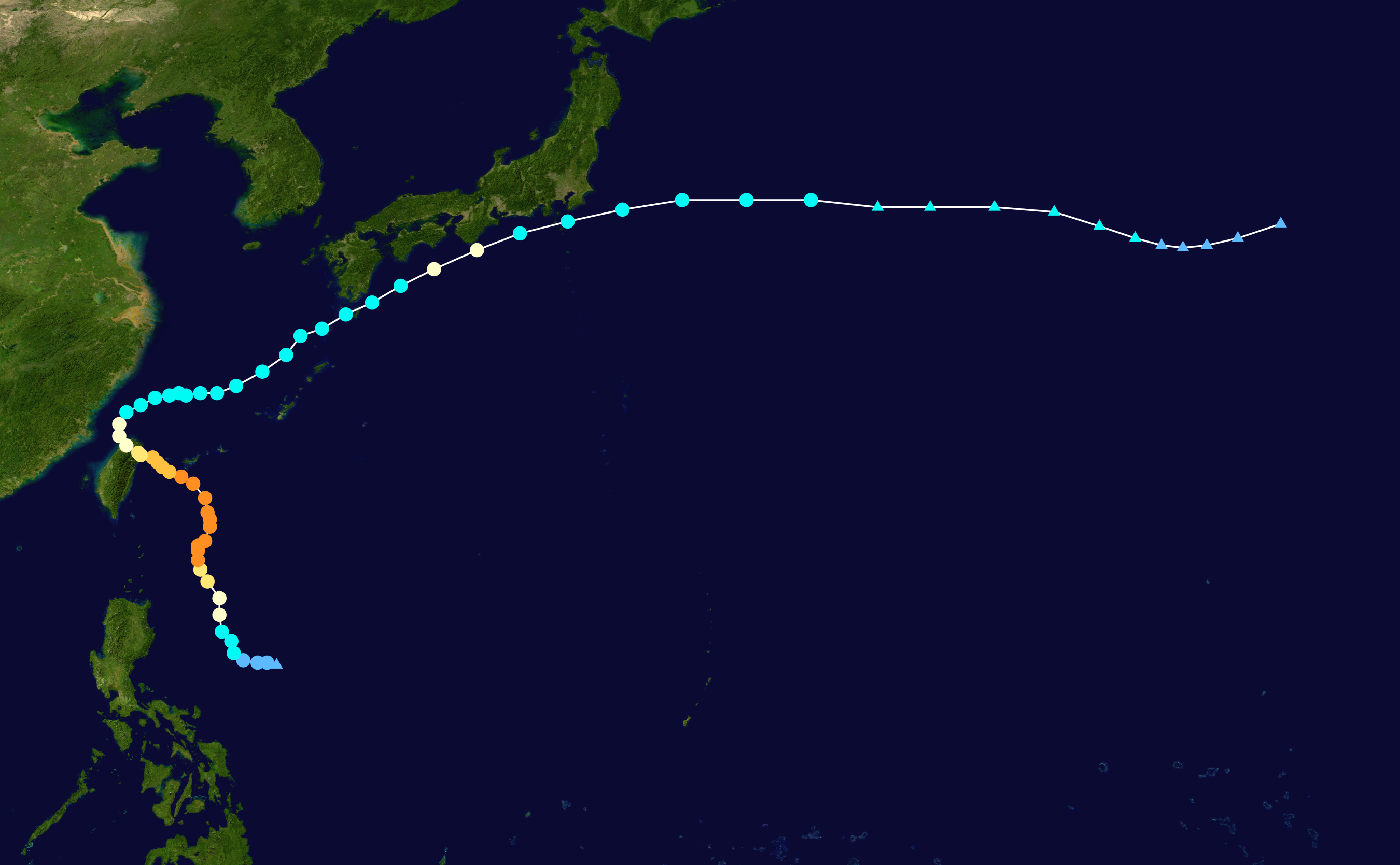
- Duration: September 8 – September 21
- Peak intensity: 185 km/h (115 mph) (10-min); 935 hPa (mbar)

On September 8, JMA and PAGASA started to issue advisories on a tropical depression which was located to the north of Manila, with PAGASA designating it as Tropical Depression Marce. During that afternoon, the JTWC designated the depression as Tropical Depression 15W. Later that day, the depression intensified into a Tropical Storm and was named Sinlaku by the JMA. During the next day, Sinlaku firstly rapidly intensified into a Severe Tropical Storm and then into a Typhoon. On September 10, Sinlaku reached its peak 1 minute sustained winds of 125 knots (145 mph). During September 11, Sinlaku started to weaken as it went under an eyewall replacement cycle. On September 13, Sinlaku made landfall on Taiwan with winds of 90 knots (170 km/h) which made Sinlaku a category-2 typhoon. As Sinlaku moved through Taiwan, Sinlaku turned to the Northeast and moved back into the South China Sea and started moving towards Japan. The next day, as Sinlaku moved towards Japan, it weakened into a Severe Tropical Storm and exited PAGASA's area of responsibility whilst the JTWC did not downgrade Sinlaku to a tropical storm until late on September 15. By then, they were followed by the JMA which downgraded Sinlaku to a tropical storm early the next day. On September 16, the JTWC reported that Sinlaku had restrengthened into a Typhoon whilst the JMA reported that Sinlaku had strengthened into a Severe Tropical Storm. However, the JTWC Quickly downgraded Sinlaku back down into a Tropical Storm whilst the JMA kept Sinlaku at Severe tropical Storm strength. The next day, the JTWC reported that Sinlaku had intensified into a typhoon for a third time. Later that day, the JTWC downgraded Sinlaku to Tropical Storm. On September 17, the JTWC issued its final advisory on Sinlaku as it became extratropical. However, the JMA kept issuing advisories on Sinlaku until early on September 21 when it became an extratropical low.

=== Tropical Depression 16W ===
- Tropical depression (JMA)
- Tropical storm (SSHWS)
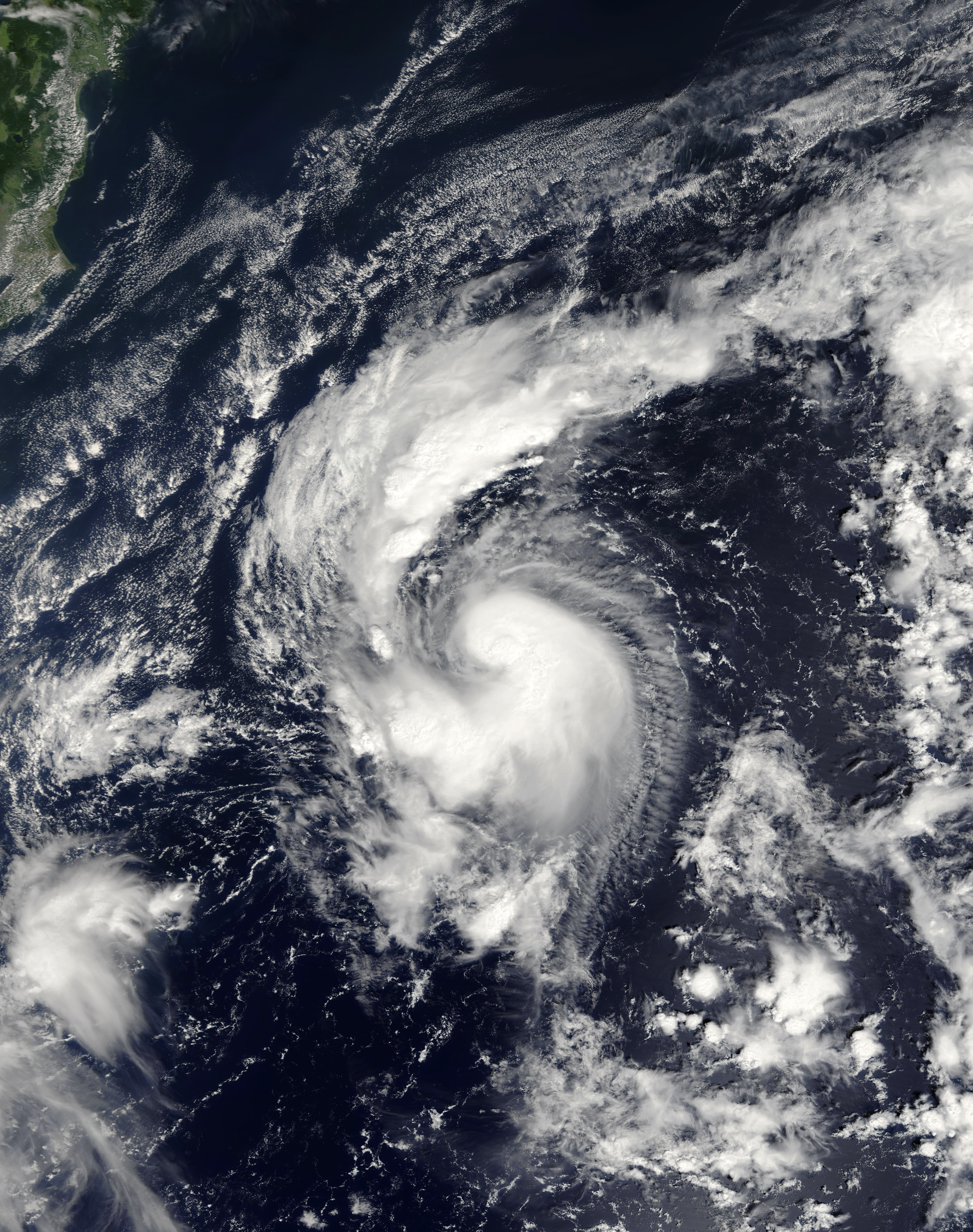
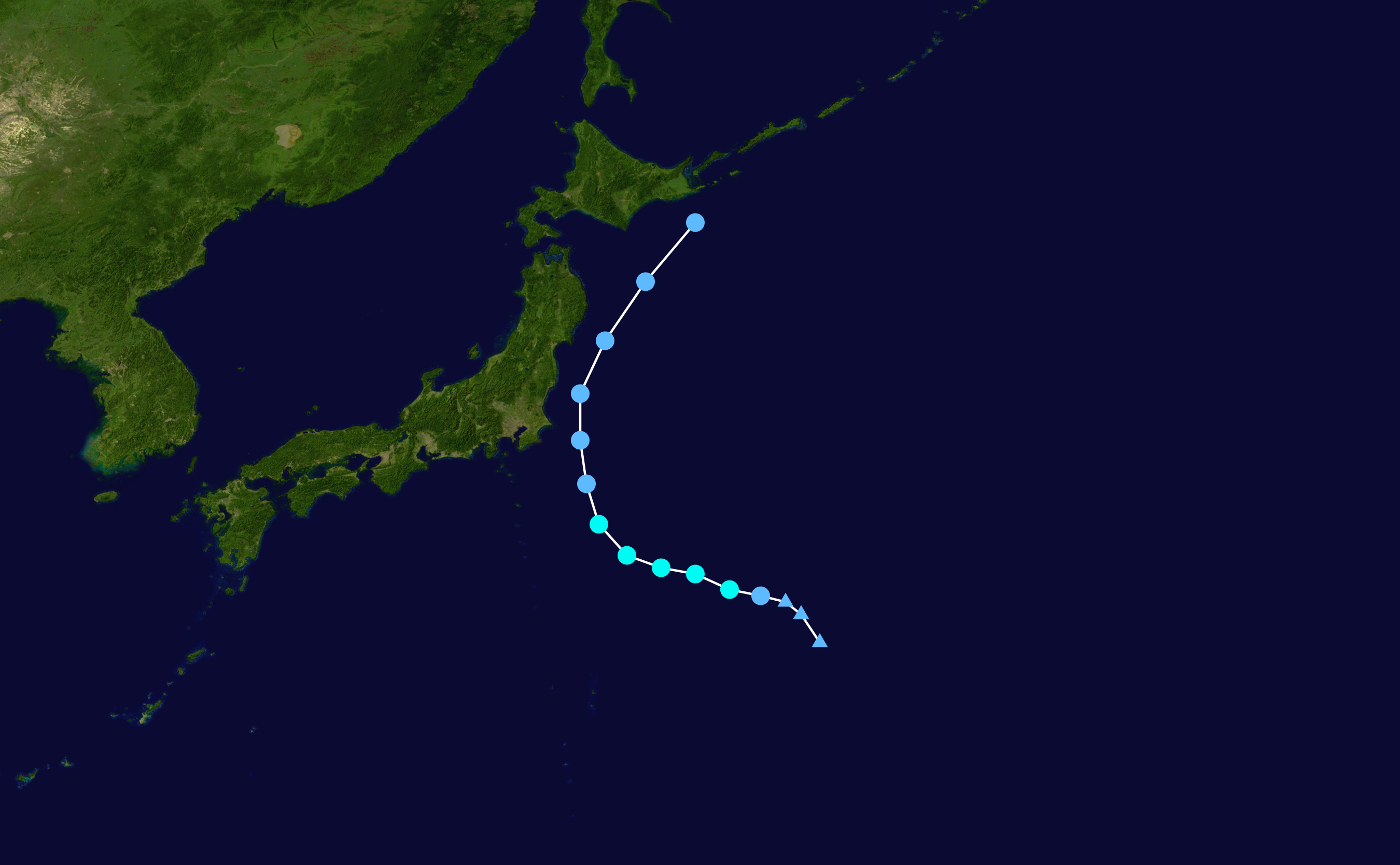
- Duration: September 9 – September 11
- Peak intensity: 55 km/h (35 mph) (10-min); 1002 hPa (mbar)

Late on September 8, a tropical disturbance formed to the southeast of Japan. It then formed into a tropical depression during the next afternoon, with the JMA designating it as a Minor Tropical Depression with wind speeds of 25 knots (46 km/h). However, the JTWC did not designate the depression as 16W until the morning of September 10. At that time, the JTWC reported the depression had intensified into a Tropical Storm. However, later that day the JTWC lowered the storm back down to a depression and then re-upgraded the depression to a tropical storm. Early the next day, the storm was downgraded by the JTWC for the last time as it had started its extratropical transition. Later that day, as the depression raced into the Baroclinic Zone, the JTWC issued its final advisory on Tropical storm 16W.

=== Tropical Depression 17W ===
- Tropical depression (JMA)
- Tropical storm (SSHWS)
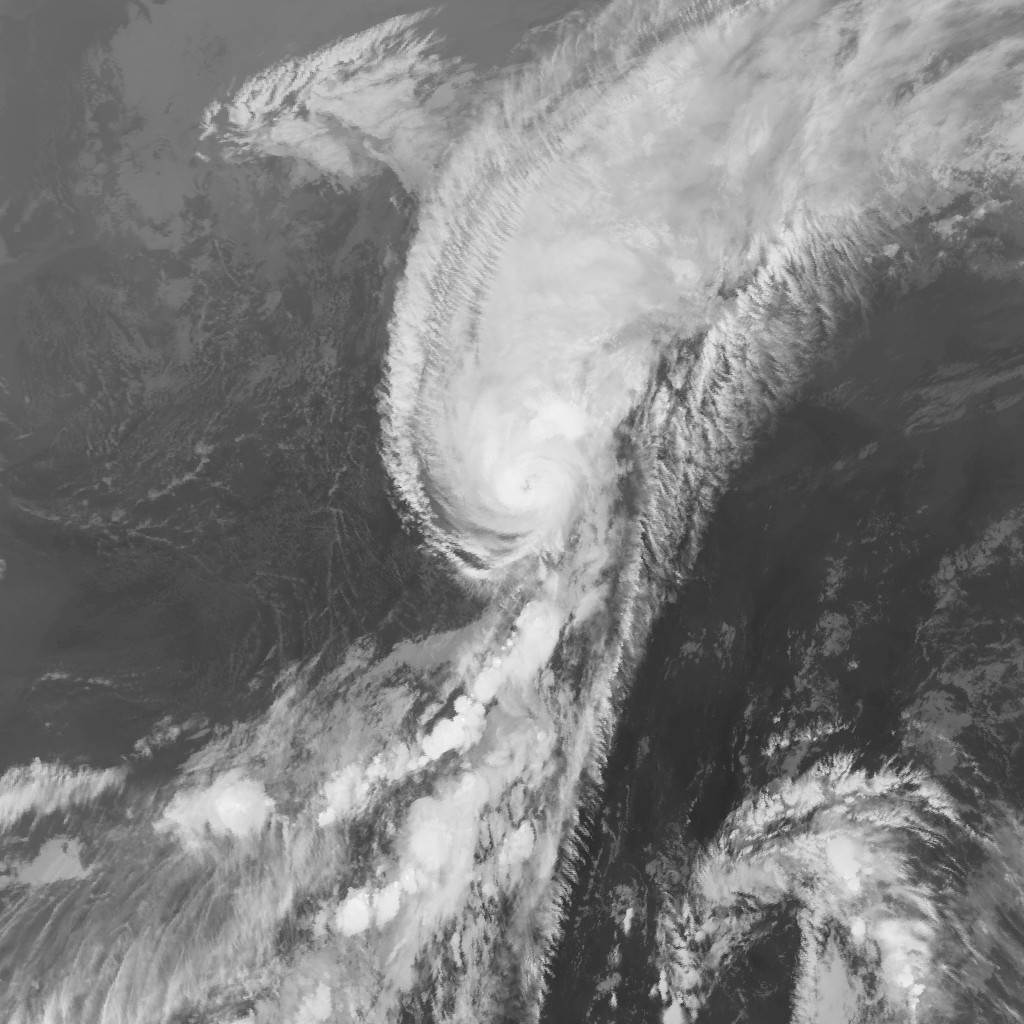
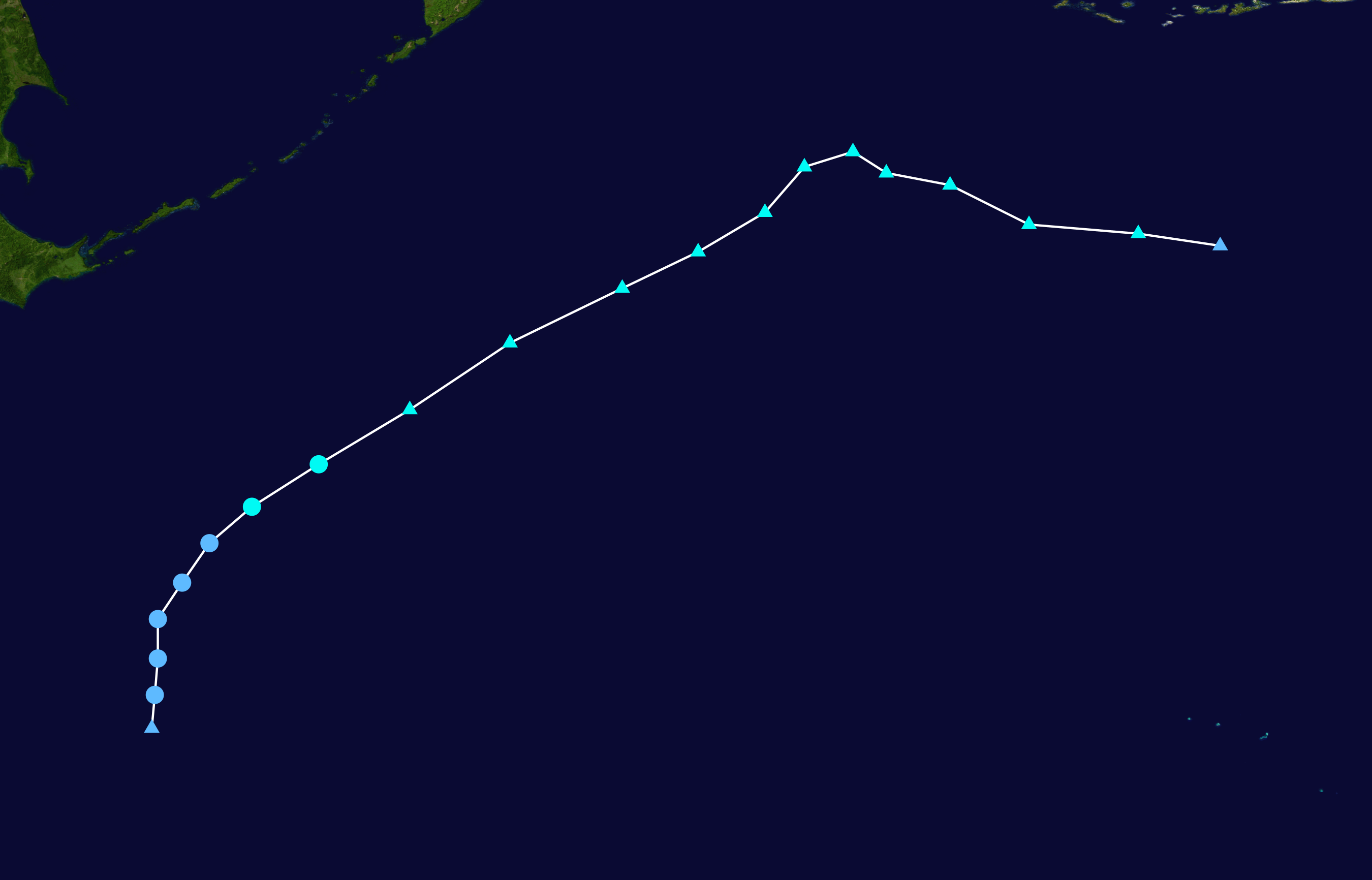
- Duration: September 13 – September 14
- Peak intensity: 45 km/h (30 mph) (10-min); 1010 hPa (mbar)

On September 13, the Japan Meteorological Agency started issuing advisories on a tropical depression located to the east of Japan, designating it as a minor tropical depression with wind speeds of 25 knots (46 km/h). The following morning, the Joint Typhoon Warning Center assigned the number 17W to the depression. However, as it had already begun its extra tropical transition, this was the only JTWC warning issued on the system.

=== Typhoon Hagupit (Nina) ===
- Very strong typhoon (JMA)
- Category 4 typhoon (SSHWS)
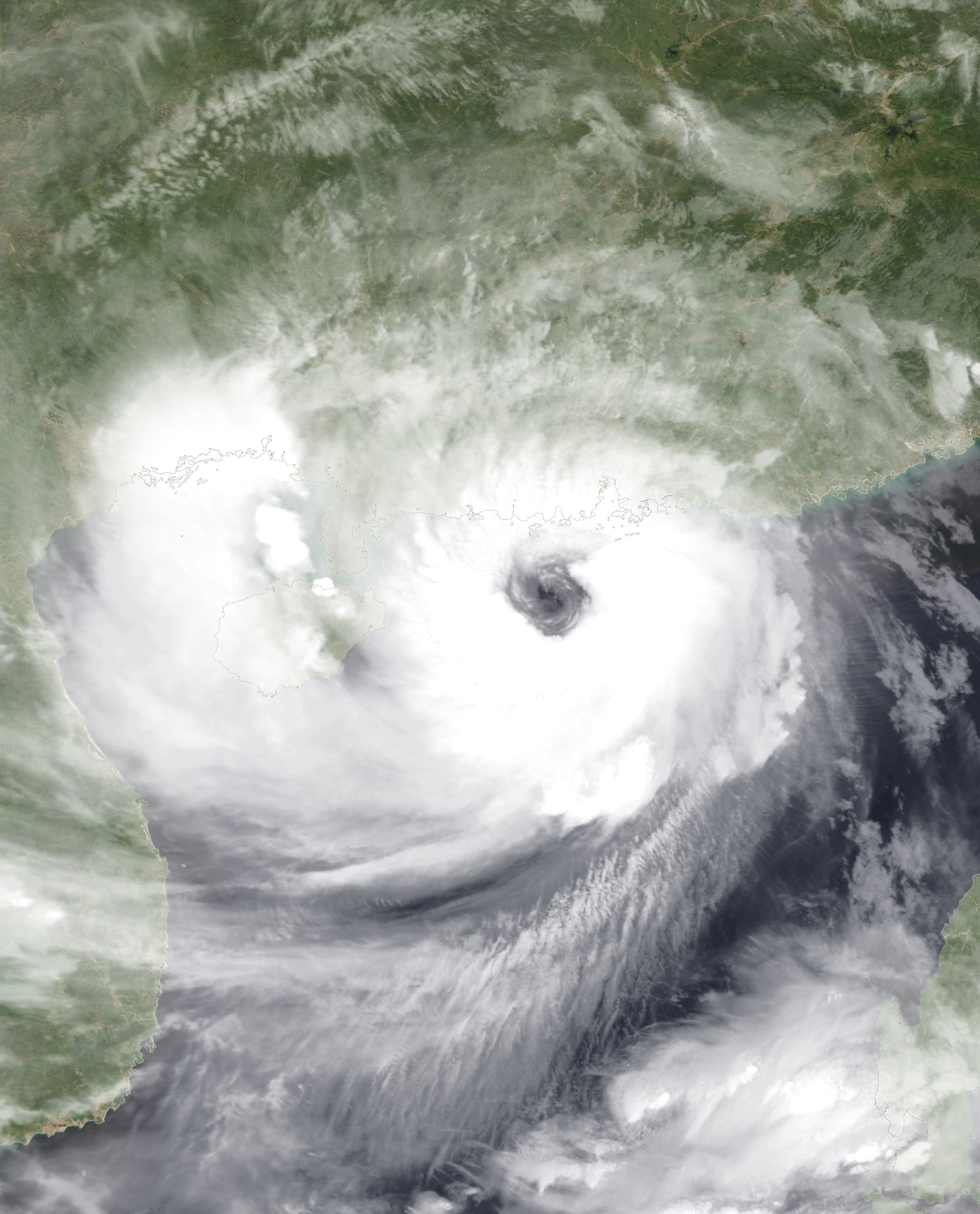
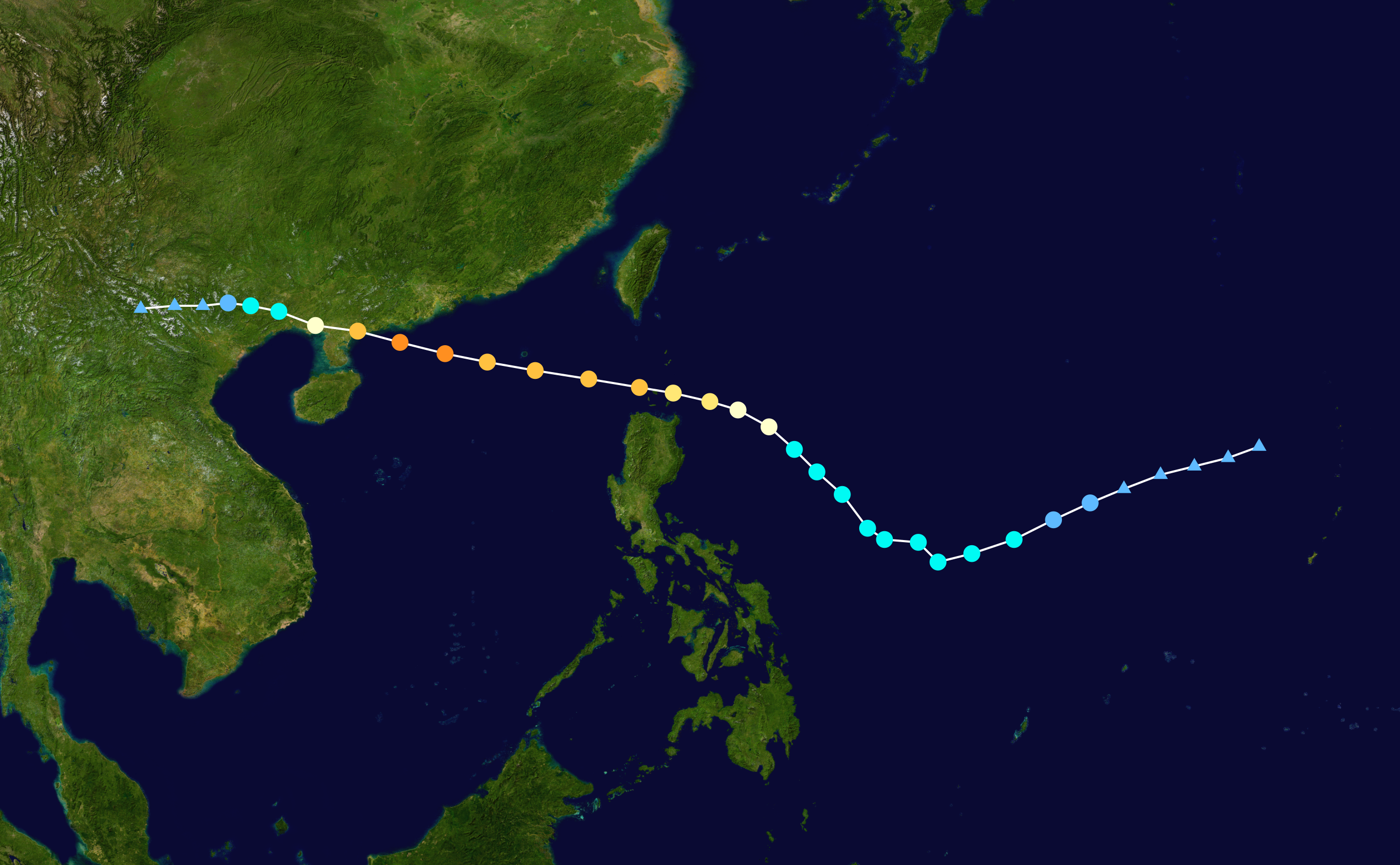
- Duration: September 18 – September 25
- Peak intensity: 185 km/h (115 mph) (10-min); 935 hPa (mbar)

On September 14, a tropical disturbance formed to the northeast of Guam. Over the next few days, it slowly developed, with the JMA designating it as a minor tropical depression on September 17. Later that day, the Joint Typhoon Warning Center (JTWC) then issued a Tropical Cyclone Formation Alert on the developing tropical depression. Late the next day, the JTWC designated the depression as 18W as it began to issue advisories on the depression. Early on September 19, the JMA began to issue full advisories on the depression as it moved into PAGASA's Area of Responsibility, naming it Nina by PAGASA. Later that day both the JMA & the JTWC upgraded the depression to a tropical storm. The JMA named the storm as Hagupit, and assigned the international number of 0814. Early the next day, Hagupit intensified into a severe tropical storm, and a category 3 typhoon later that day. It reached maximum intensity with 140 mph (230 km/h) winds on September 23, and made landfall at that strength the next day. It then dissipated over land, and on September 24, JTWC issued its final advisory on the system followed by JMA early the next day.

=== Typhoon Jangmi (Ofel) ===
- Violent typhoon (JMA)
- Category 5 super typhoon (SSHWS)
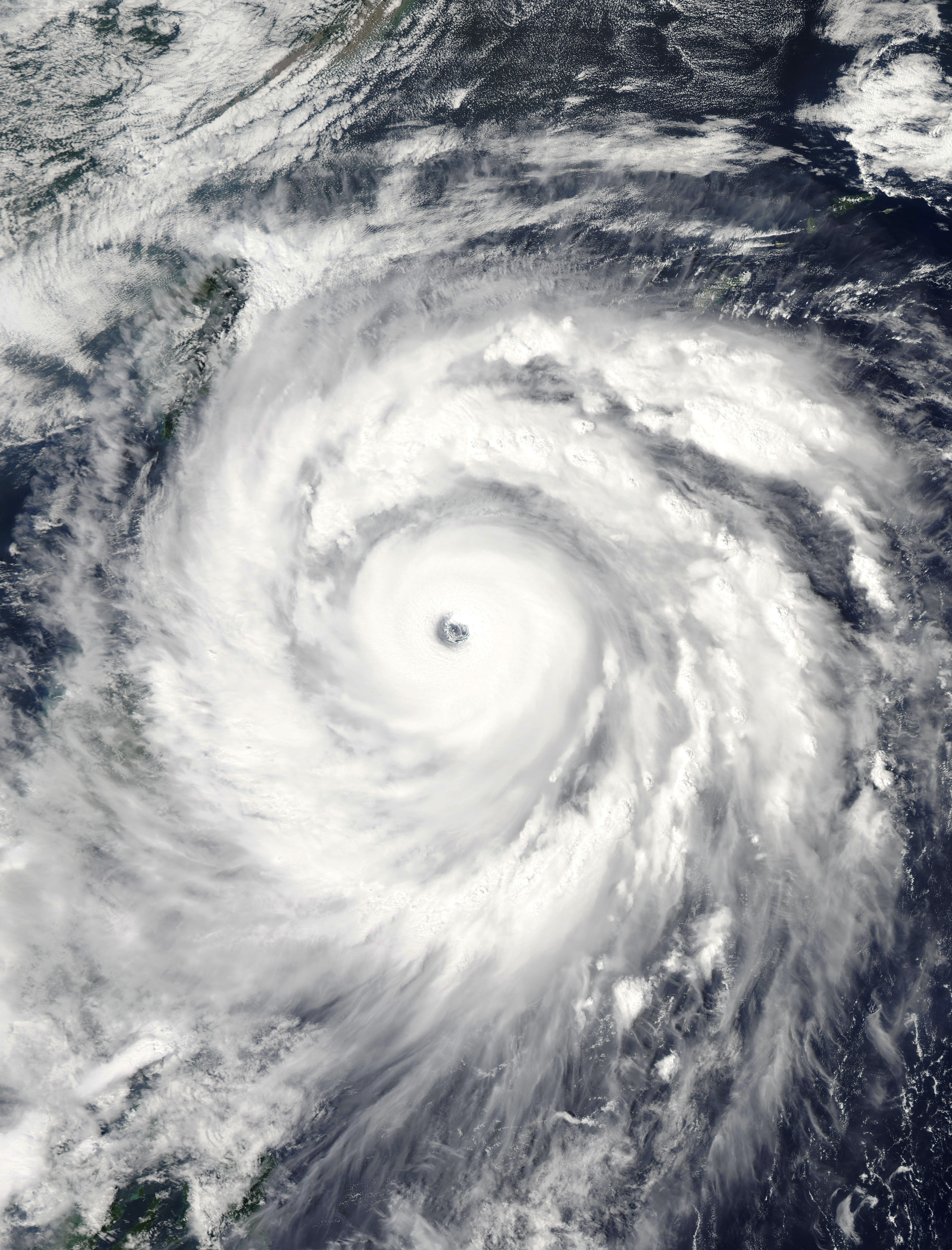
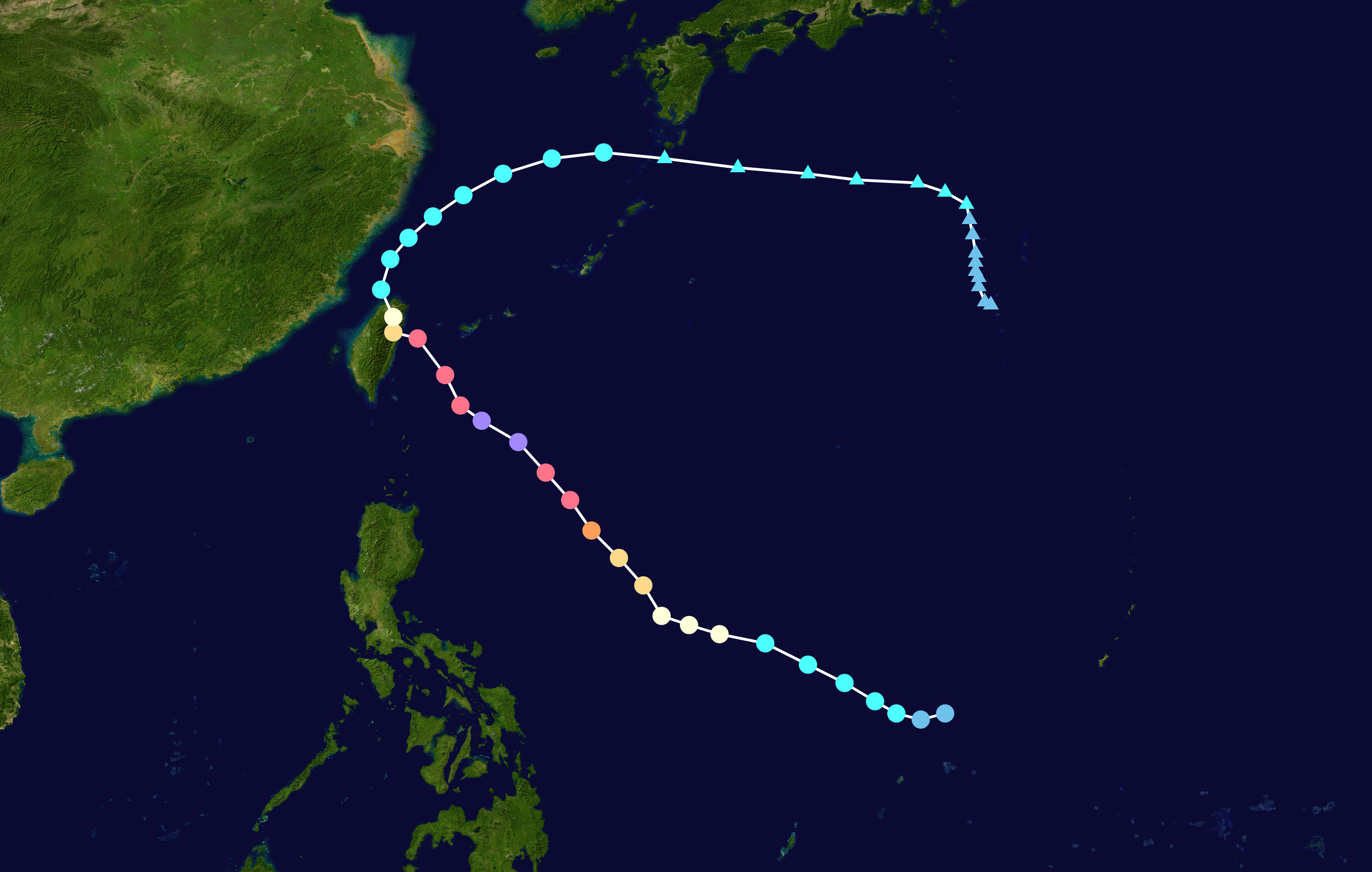
- Duration: September 23 – October 1
- Peak intensity: 215 km/h (130 mph) (10-min); 905 hPa (mbar)

Forming south of Guam on September 22. JTWC issued a TCFA and upgraded the low-pressure area to a tropical depression on the next day. Both JTWC and JMA upgraded the system to a tropical storm named Jangmi on September 24, as well as it entered the Philippine Area of Responsibility, earning the name Ofel from the PAGASA. On September 25, Jangmi intensified into a typhoon for its developing eye. On September 26, Jangmi formed an cirrus-filled and ambiguous eye, as the typhoon gradually intensified owing to strong radial outflow.

On September 27, JTWC upgraded Jangmi to a super typhoon with a round eye; at noon, the typhoon attained peak intensity by the ten-minute maximum sustained winds reaching 115 knots (213 km/h; 132 mph) and the atmospheric pressure decreasing to 905 hPa (26.7 inHg). On September 28, after JTWC downgraded Jangmi to a typhoon, it made landfall over Yilan, Taiwan at 15:40 TST (07:40 UTC). Jangmi weakened significantly by the mountainous terrain of Taiwan after landfall, and it arrived at the Taiwan Strait from Taoyuan County (now Taoyuan City) at 04:20 TST on September 29 (20:20 UTC on September 28).

On September 29, both JMA and JTWC downgraded Jangmi to a tropical storm in the East China Sea. On September 30, Jangmi underwent extratropical transition and became fully extratropical near the Ōsumi Islands on the next day. It ultimately dissipated near Iwo Jima on October 5.

=== Tropical Storm Mekkhala ===
- Tropical storm (JMA)
- Tropical storm (SSHWS)
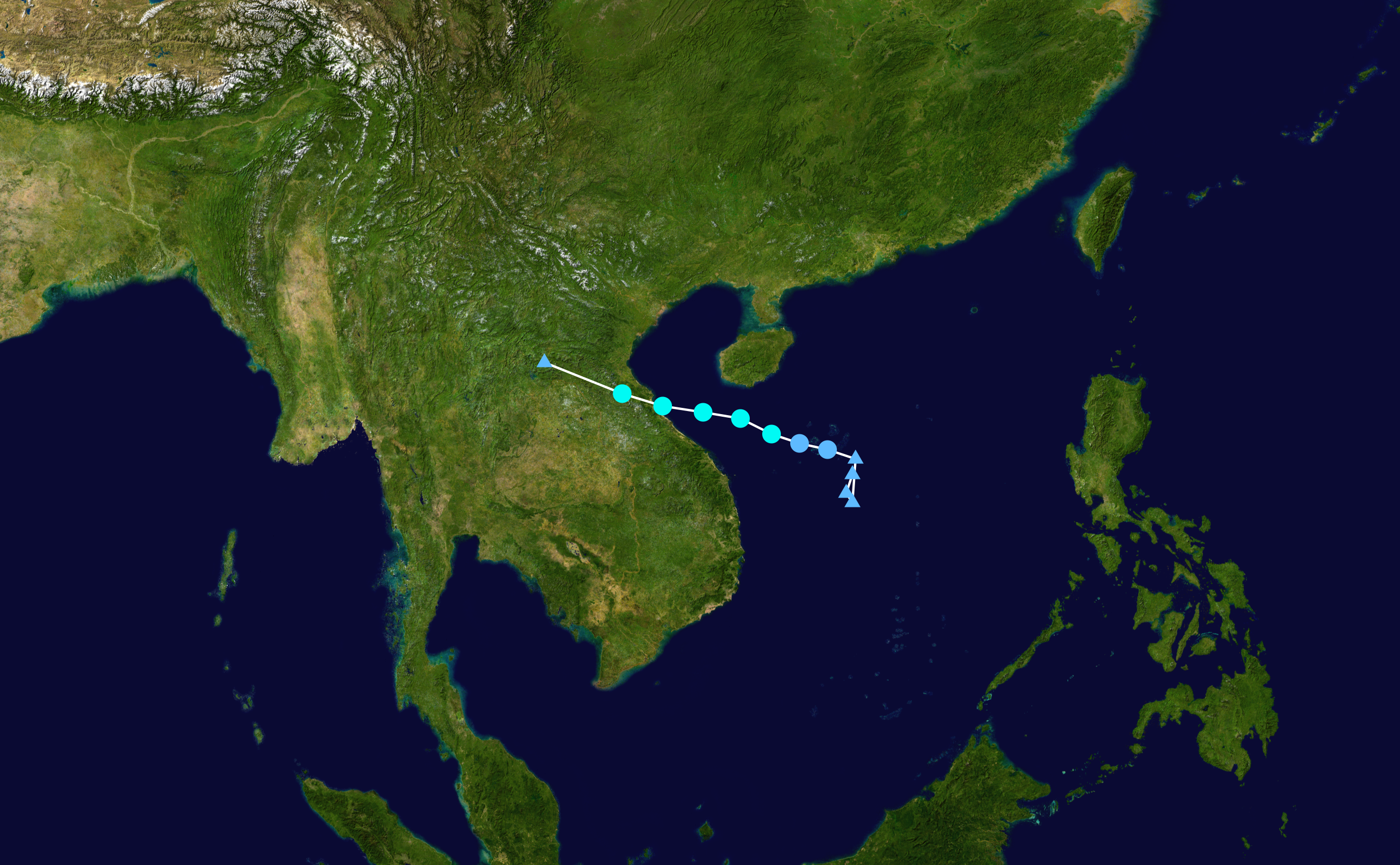
- Duration: September 27 – September 30
- Peak intensity: 85 km/h (50 mph) (10-min); 990 hPa (mbar)

On September 25, a tropical disturbance formed to the south of China in the Gulf of Tonkin. Over the next few days, it gradually intensified and late on September 27 the JMA designated it as a tropical depression. Early the next day, the JTWC issued a Tropical Cyclone Formation Alert on the developing depression and then later that day, they designated the depression as Tropical Depression 20W. Early on September 28, the JMA reported that the depression had intensified into a tropical storm and named it as Mekkhala. Later that day the JTWC upgraded Mekkhala to a Tropical Storm. However, on the 30th it began to move inland and thus, early that day, JTWC issued its final advisory on Mekkhala as it is expected to dissipate within a short time. Later that day, the JMA downgraded the storm to a tropical depression and issued the final advisory.

A sustained wind speed of 90 km/h (56 mph) and a minimum atmospheric pressure of 985.8 hPa were recorded at Cồn Cỏ Island near the coast of Vietnam. On mainland Vietnam, Kỳ Anh (Hà Tĩnh) recorded a sustained wind speed of 86 km/h (54 mph).

At least 21 people have been killed due to Tropical Storm Mekkhala. Damages from the storm totaled to $6.6 million (USD)

=== Tropical Storm Higos (Pablo) ===
- Tropical storm (JMA)
- Tropical storm (SSHWS)
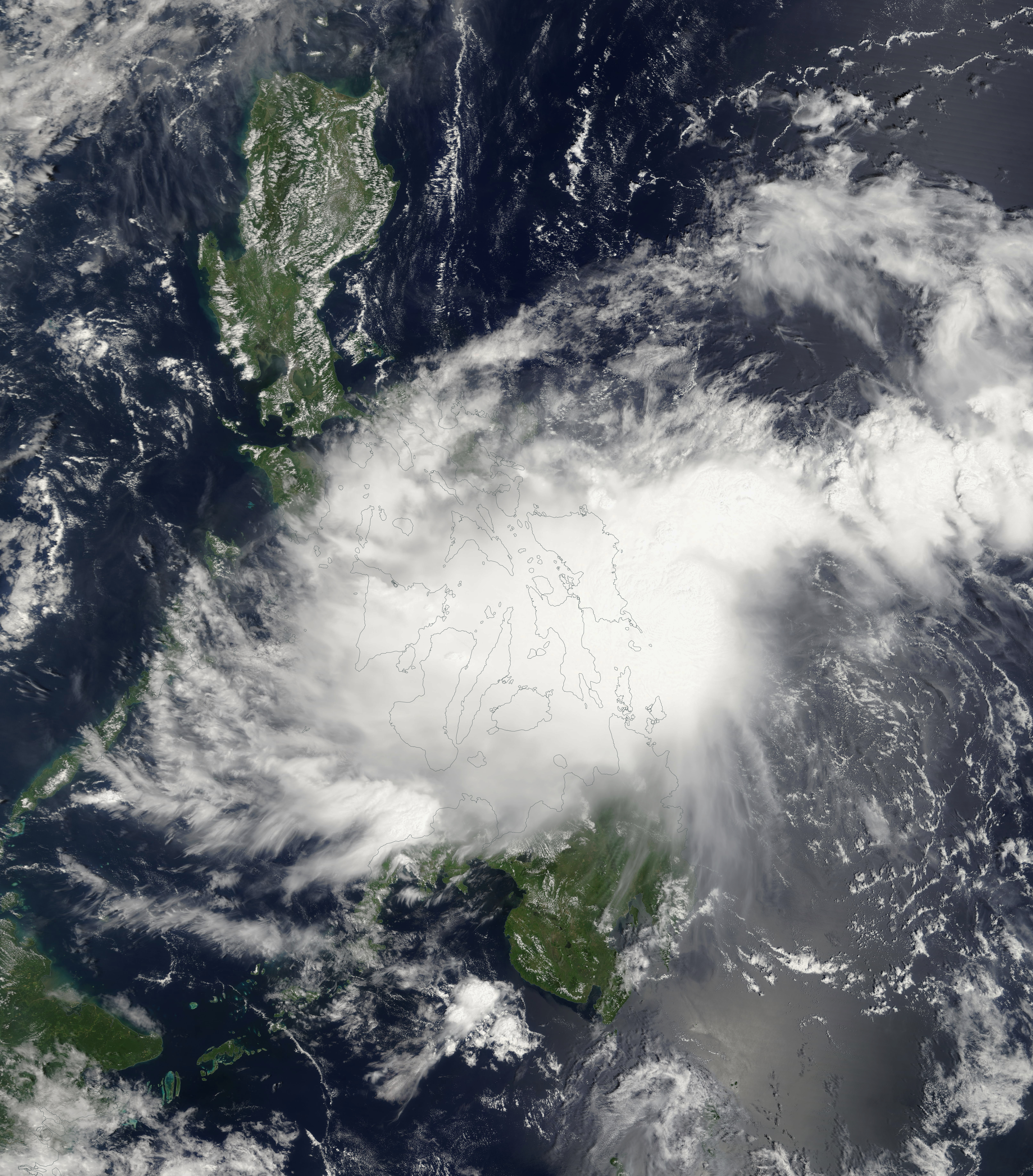
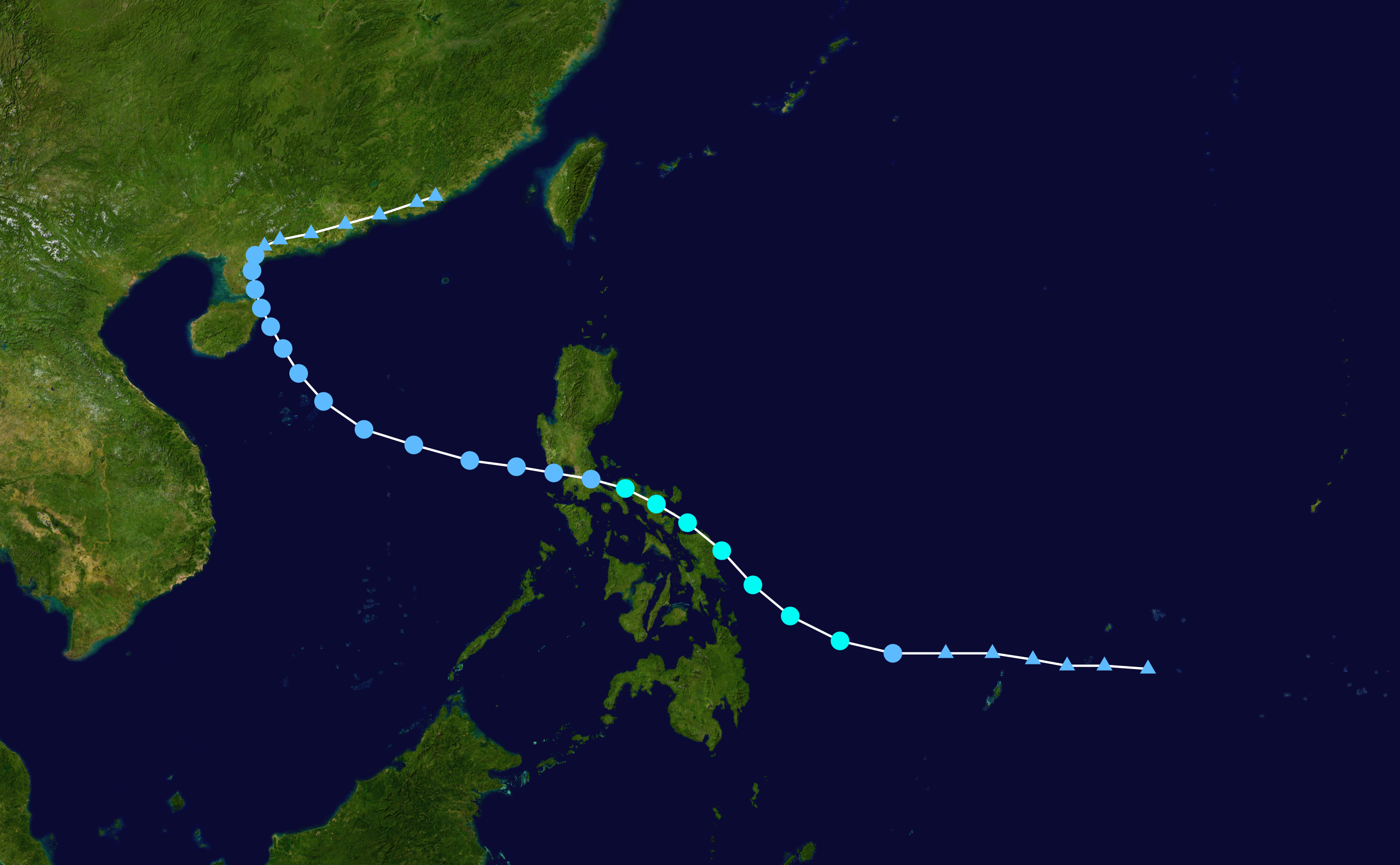
- Duration: September 29 – October 6
- Peak intensity: 75 km/h (45 mph) (10-min); 998 hPa (mbar)

On September 27, a tropical disturbance formed in the Philippine Sea to the east of Mindanao, in the Philippines. During the next day, the JTWC issued a TCFA on the tropical disturbance. Early on September 29, the JMA designated the disturbance as a tropical depression. Later that day, both PAGASA and the JTWC designated the disturbance as a tropical depression, with PAGASA naming the depression as Pablo, whilst the JTWC designated it as Tropical Depression 21W. The JTWC upgraded the depression to a tropical storm early in the afternoon. The JMA followed shortly after and upgraded the system to Tropical Storm Higos early on September 30. Higos tracked towards the northwest and made landfall in the eastern Philippines (on Samar island) on October 1. Higos tracked over the Philippines as a tropical storm (but PAGASA downgraded it as a tropical depression) for most of the day before moving out over open waters. Once out over water, the JTWC downgraded Higos to a tropical depression, however, the JMA kept it as a tropical storm. As Higos neared landfall, it suddenly relocated, paralleling the northeastern coast of Hainan, China. The storm later made landfall on October 4 around 2 a.m. (CST) on the northern coastline of the island. JMA then issued its final advisory as Higos weakened to a tropical depression. The JTWC followed 12 hours later.

=== Tropical Depression 22W ===
- Tropical depression (JMA)
- Tropical storm (SSHWS)
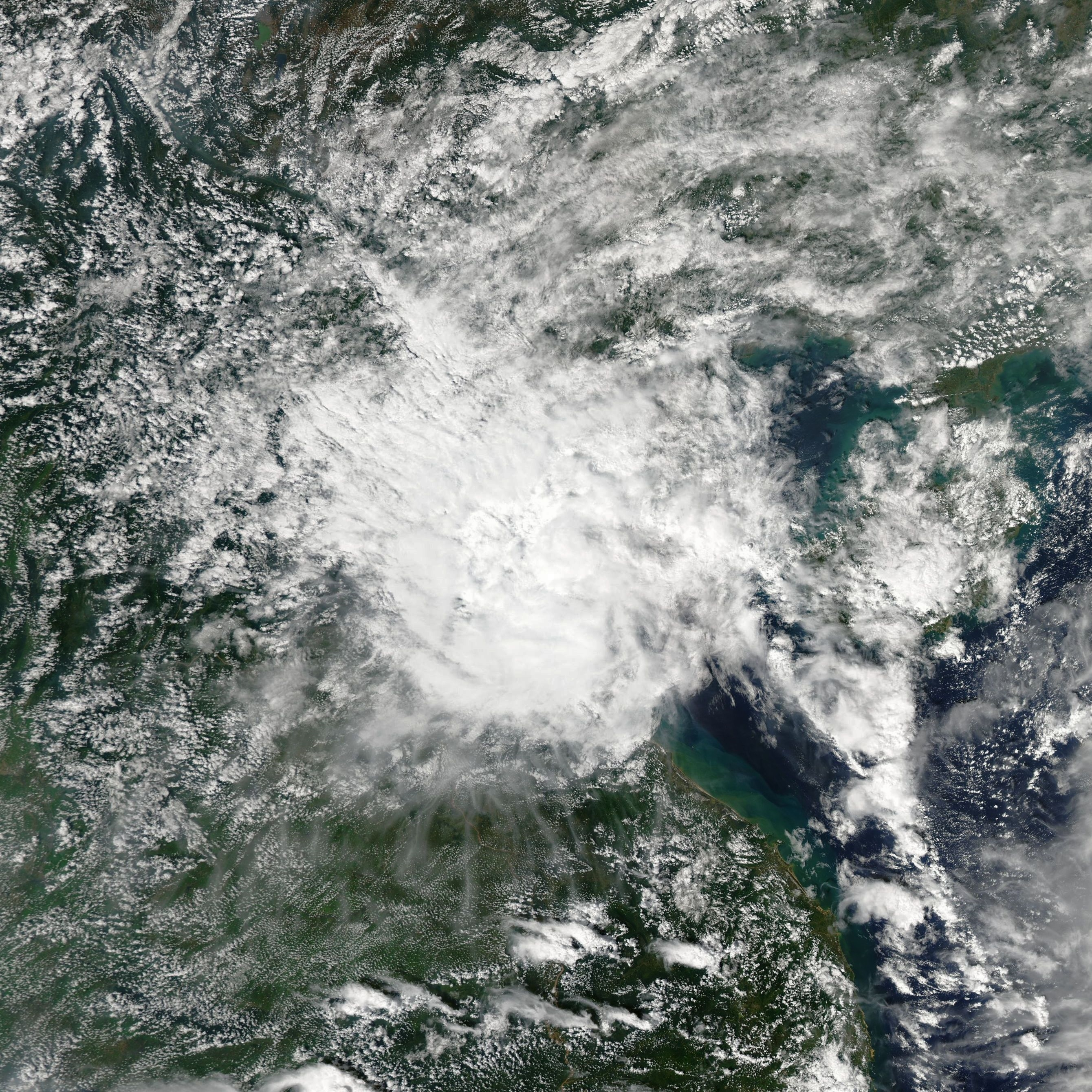
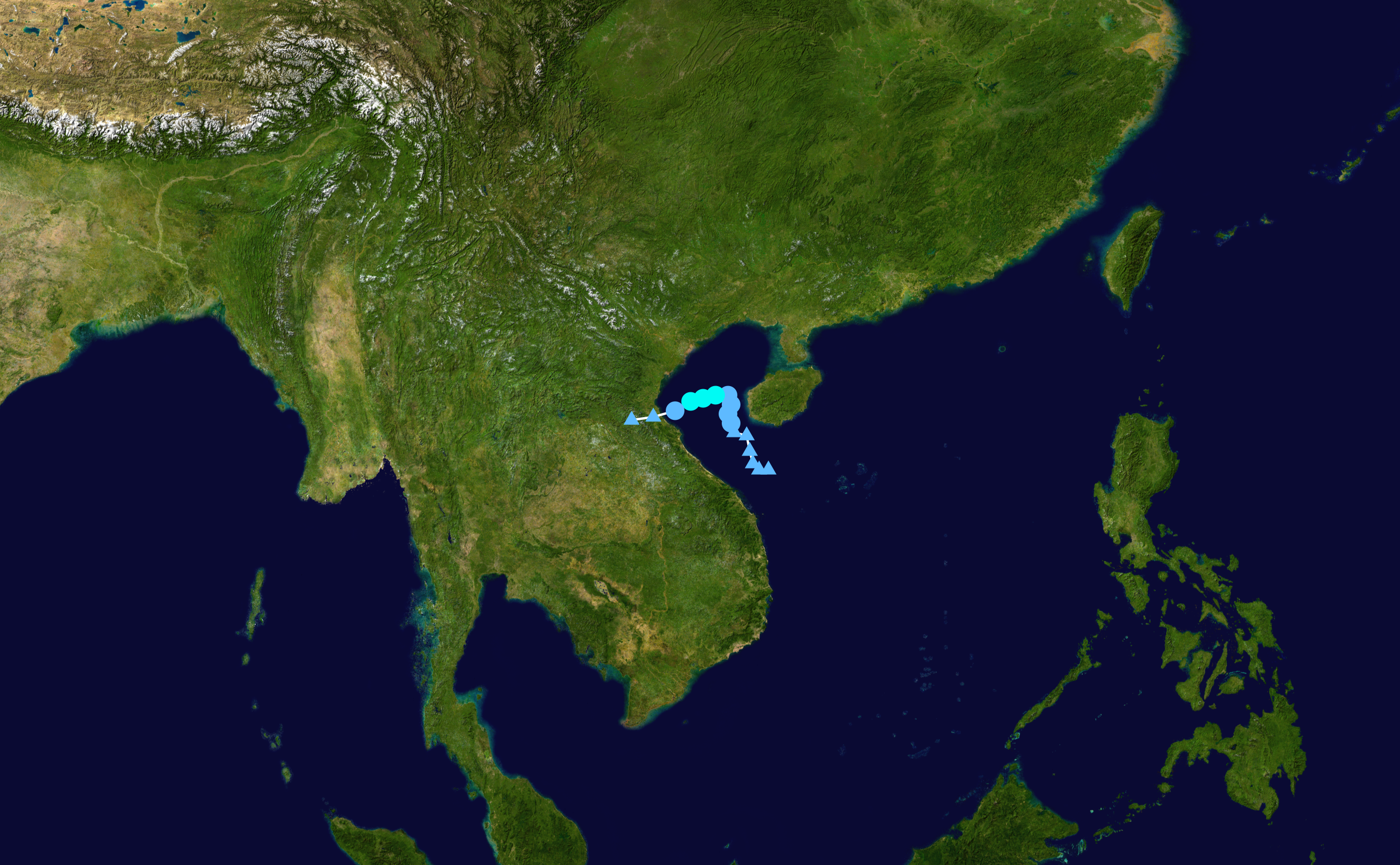
- Duration: October 12 – October 15
- Peak intensity: 55 km/h (35 mph) (10-min); 1006 hPa (mbar)

On October 13, the Japan Meteorological Agency designated a low-pressure area in the Gulf of Tonkin as a minor tropical depression with wind speeds of 25 knots (46 km/h). The China Meteorological Administration and Hong Kong Observatory both declared this system a tropical depression that day as it moved slowly towards northern Vietnam. On October 14, the JMA notes that the depression has strengthened to 30 knots (56 km/h) with little northwestward movement. JTWC began issuing warnings late morning as a tropical depression, and in the evening, they upgraded it to a tropical storm, forecasting it to strengthen even further before making its landfall over northern Vietnam. The system did not gain anymore strength in the Gulf of Tonkin and on October 15 made landfall over northern Vietnam. The Joint Typhoon Warning Center issued its final advisory on this system expecting it to dissipate near Laos by October 16.

A sustained wind speed of 72 km/h (45 mph) was recorded at Hòn Ngư Island near the coast of Vietnam.

=== Tropical Storm Bavi ===
- Tropical storm (JMA)
- Tropical storm (SSHWS)
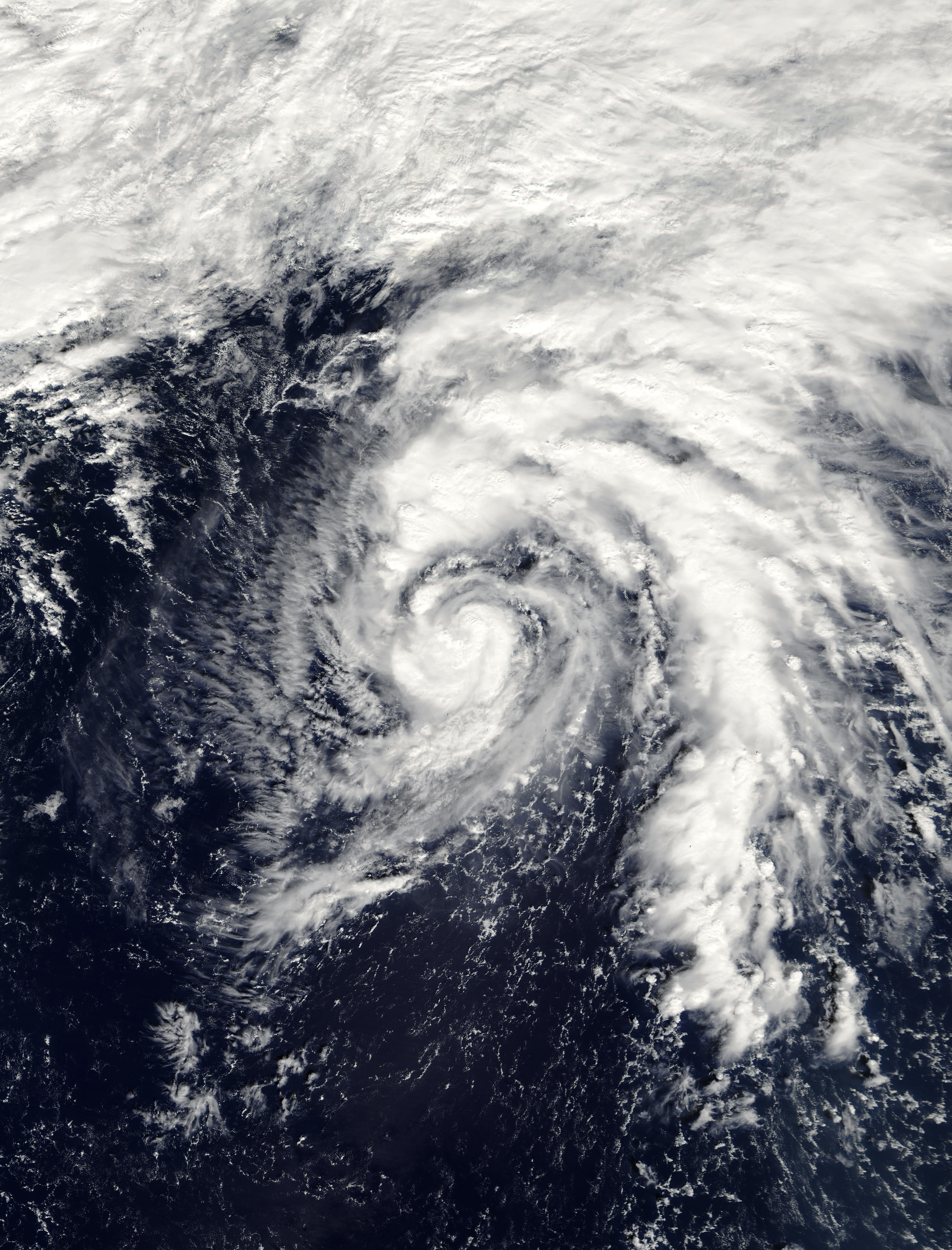
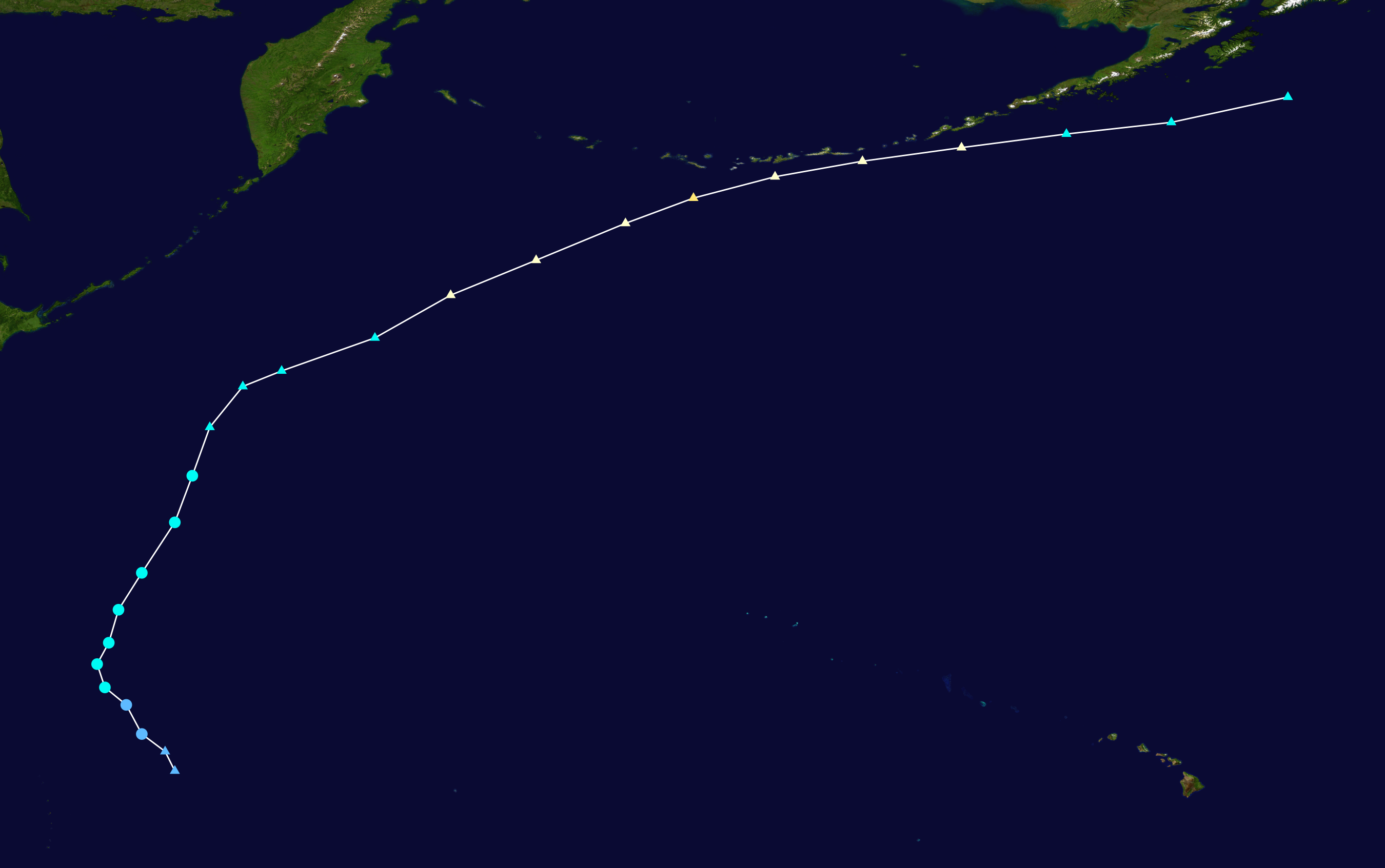
- Duration: October 18 – October 20
- Peak intensity: 85 km/h (50 mph) (10-min); 992 hPa (mbar)

On October 18, an area of low pressure well to the southeast of Japan quickly strengthened to become a Tropical Storm, with the JMA naming it Bavi. Bavi strengthened to gain 50 mph (80 km/h) winds, but transitioned into an extra-tropical cyclone on 21 October, while still well to the east of Japan.

=== Severe Tropical Storm Maysak (Quinta–Siony) ===
- Severe tropical storm (JMA)
- Tropical storm (SSHWS)
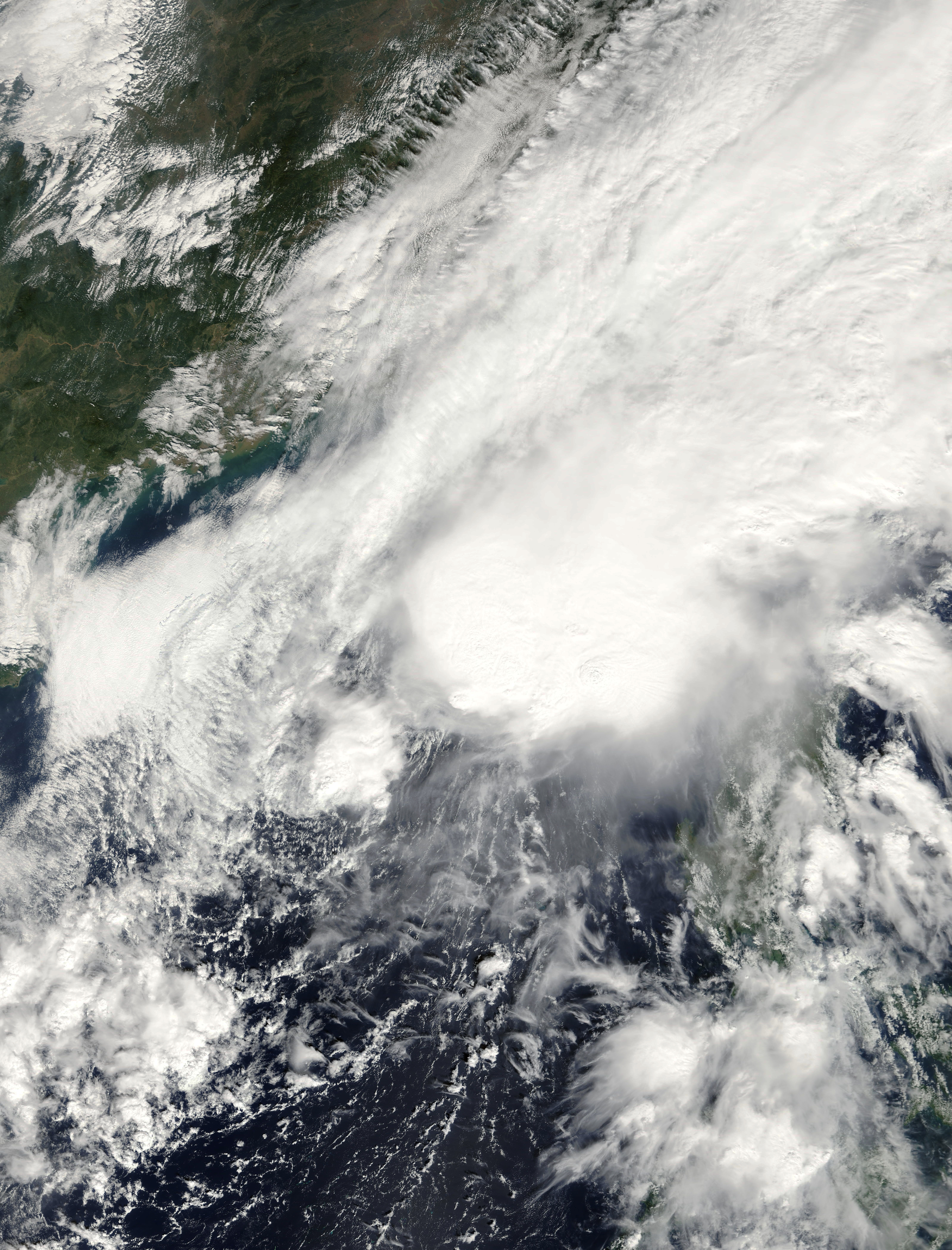
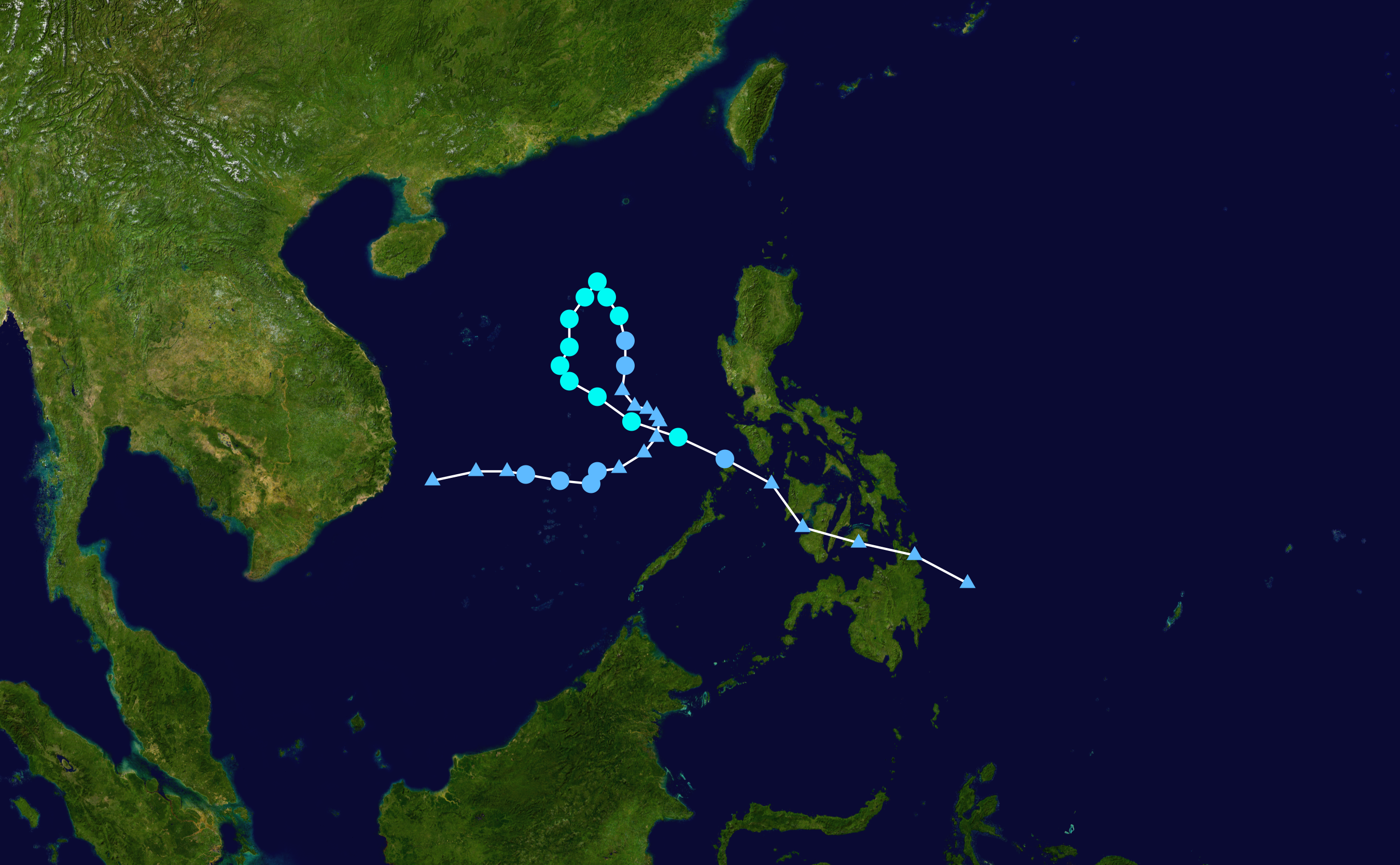
- Duration: November 6 – November 14
- Peak intensity: 95 km/h (60 mph) (10-min); 985 hPa (mbar)

On November 5, a tropical disturbance formed in the Philippine Sea to the northeast of Zamboanga, in the Philippines. Later that day, the JTWC assessed the disturbance chances of forming into a Significant Tropical cyclone within 24 hours as poor. Early the next day, PAGASA designated the disturbance as a Tropical Depression and named it as Quinta, whilst the JTWC still monitored it as a disturbance. Later that day the JTWC upgraded the disturbances chances of forming into a significant tropical cyclone to Good and issued a Tropical Cyclone Formation Alert on the disturbance and then designated the disturbance as Tropical Depression 24W as they issued their first advisory on the Depression. On November 12, PAGASA issued their final warning as it transform into a low-pressure area. PAGASA renamed the system as Siony on November 12 as it redeveloped. Later that day, they issued their final advisory again as it moved out of their area of responsibility.

=== Tropical Depression Rolly ===
- Tropical depression (PAGASA)
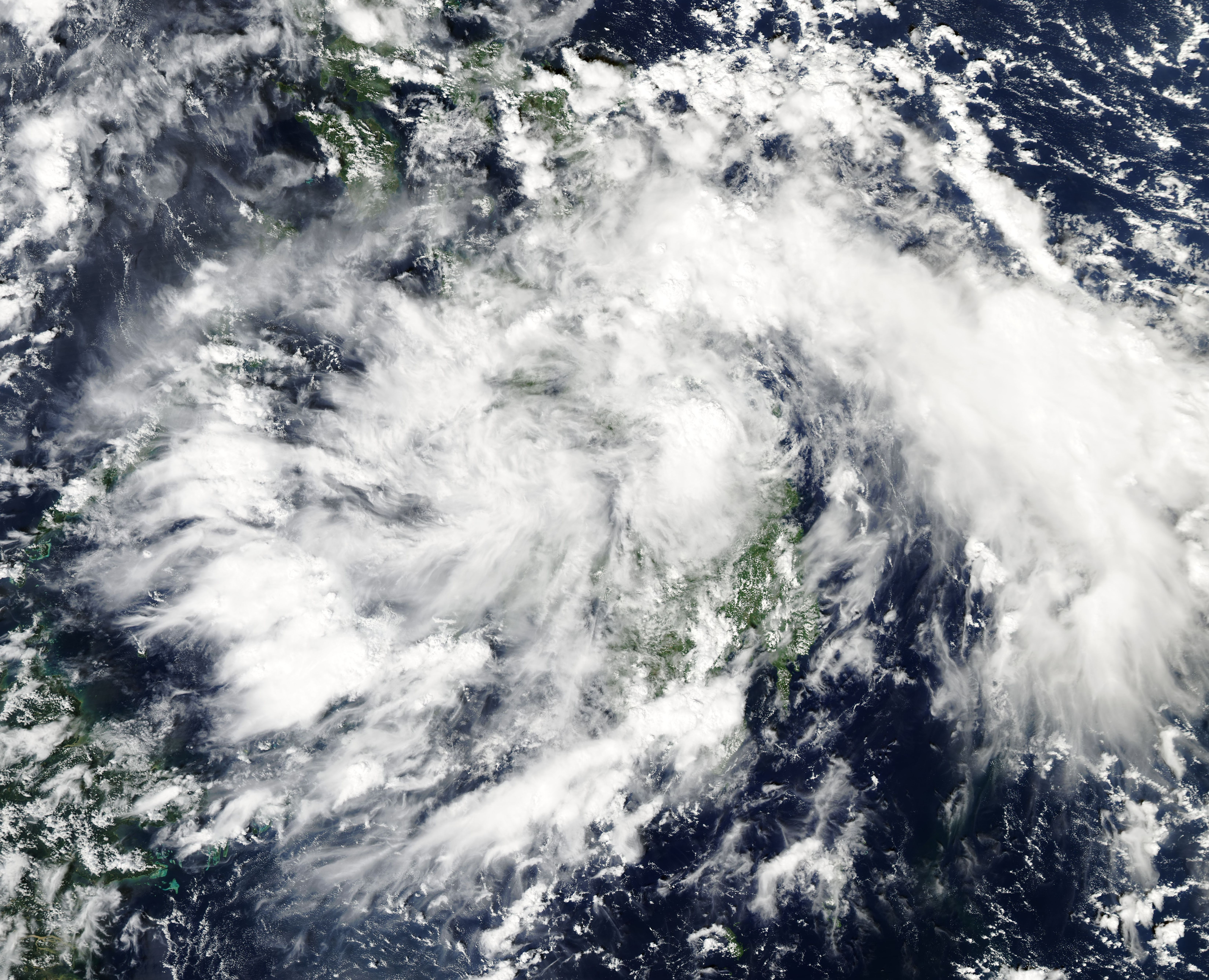
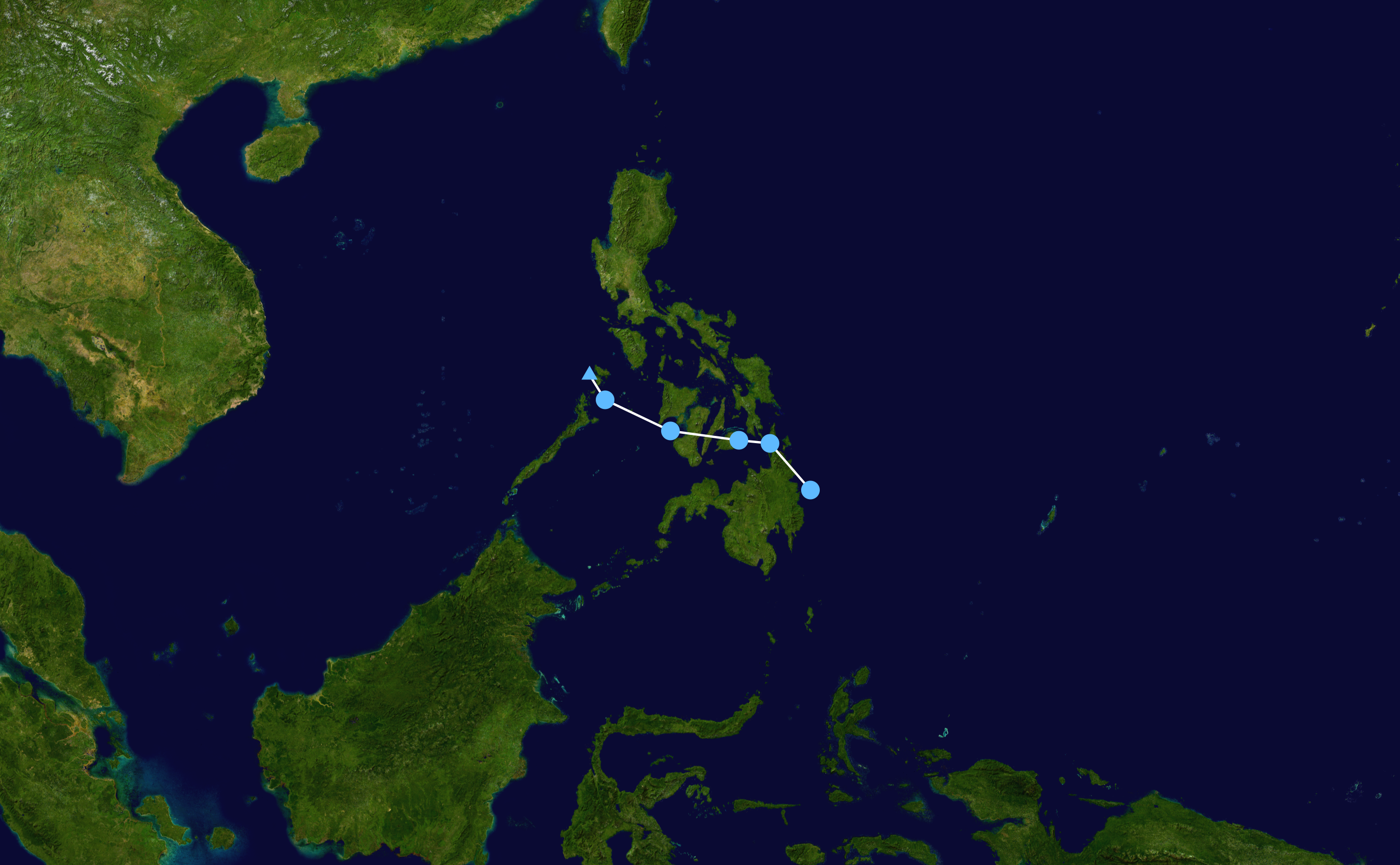
- Duration: November 7 – November 9
- Peak intensity: 55 km/h (35 mph) (10-min); 1006 hPa (mbar)

Early on November 7, a tropical disturbance formed about 475 nm to the east of Zamboanga in the Philippines. Animated multi-spectral imagery at this time showed that the disturbance had disorganized convection which was located near to a developing low-level circulation center and was located within a favorable upper-level environment for development. An anticyclone was providing vertical wind-sheer. However, the disturbance was already interacting with land as it was rapidly approaching Mindanao. Later that day, after it had moved through parts of Mindanao, it was named as Tropical Depression Rolly by PAGASA as they placed several parts of Mindanao and Visayas under public storm signal number one. All signals were then canceled the next morning as PAGASA released their final advisory on Rolly as it had weakened into an area of low pressure over Palawan. The JTWC then declared that the low-pressure area had dissipated later that morning. Rough seas produced by the depression capsized a vessel carrying eleven people. The Philippine Coast Guard quickly responded to the incident and rescued all crew members.

=== Tropical Storm Haishen ===
- Tropical storm (JMA)
- Tropical storm (SSHWS)
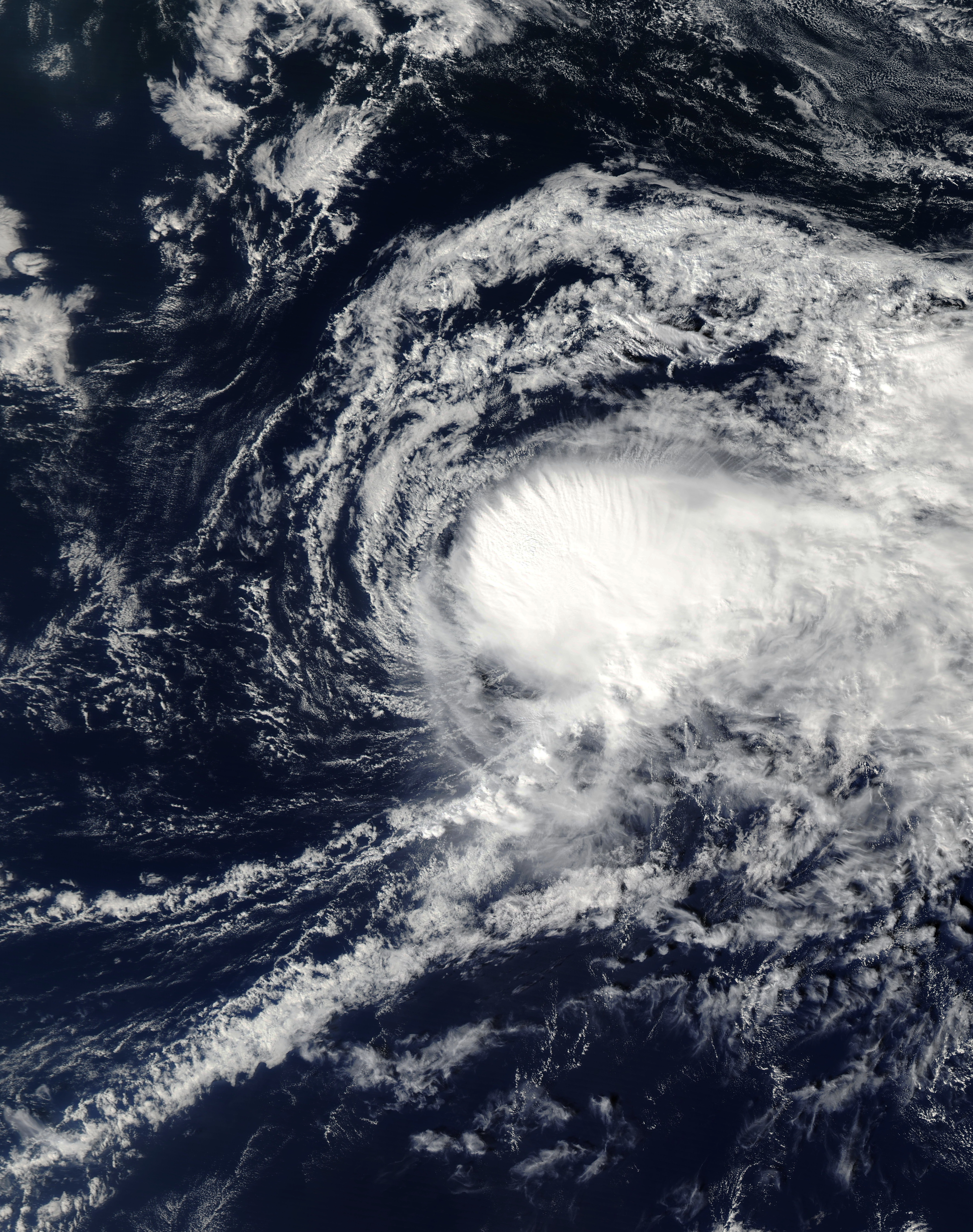
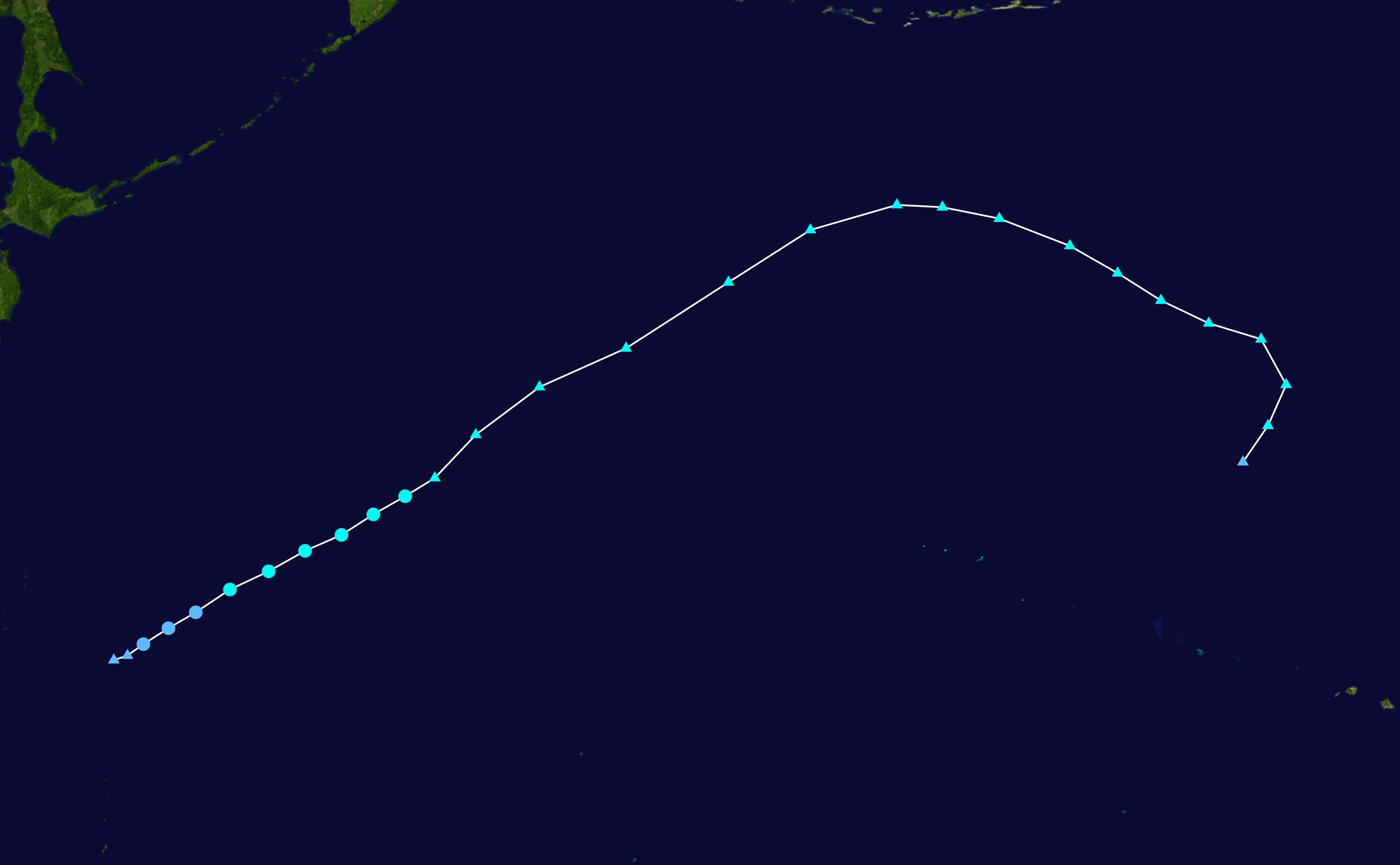
- Duration: November 14 – November 17
- Peak intensity: 75 km/h (45 mph) (10-min); 1004 hPa (mbar)

On November 14, the JMA reported that tropical depression formed 490 km (300 mi) to the southeast of Iwo To, despite the JTWC noting the tropical cyclone formation was unlikely within the next 24 hours due to lack of deep convection. Later that day, deep convection began to persist near the center, indicating the storm developed a fully warm tropical core. Despite increased vertical wind shear, the JTWC issued a Tropical Cyclone Formation Alert on the system. During that evening, the JMA upgraded the depression to a tropical storm while the JTWC designated Haishen as a tropical depression. Early on November 16, Haishen attained its peak intensity of 75 km/h (45 mph). Traveling along the north portion of a subtropical ridge to the southeast of the system, dry air began to take toll on the system. The JTWC then issued their final warning later that day, as Haishen rapidly transitioned into an extratropical cyclone. The JMA followed suit 24 hours later. The extratropical low of Haishen accelerated towards the International Date Line, where it briefly reintensified.

=== Tropical Storm Noul (Tonyo) ===
- Tropical storm (JMA)
- Tropical storm (SSHWS)
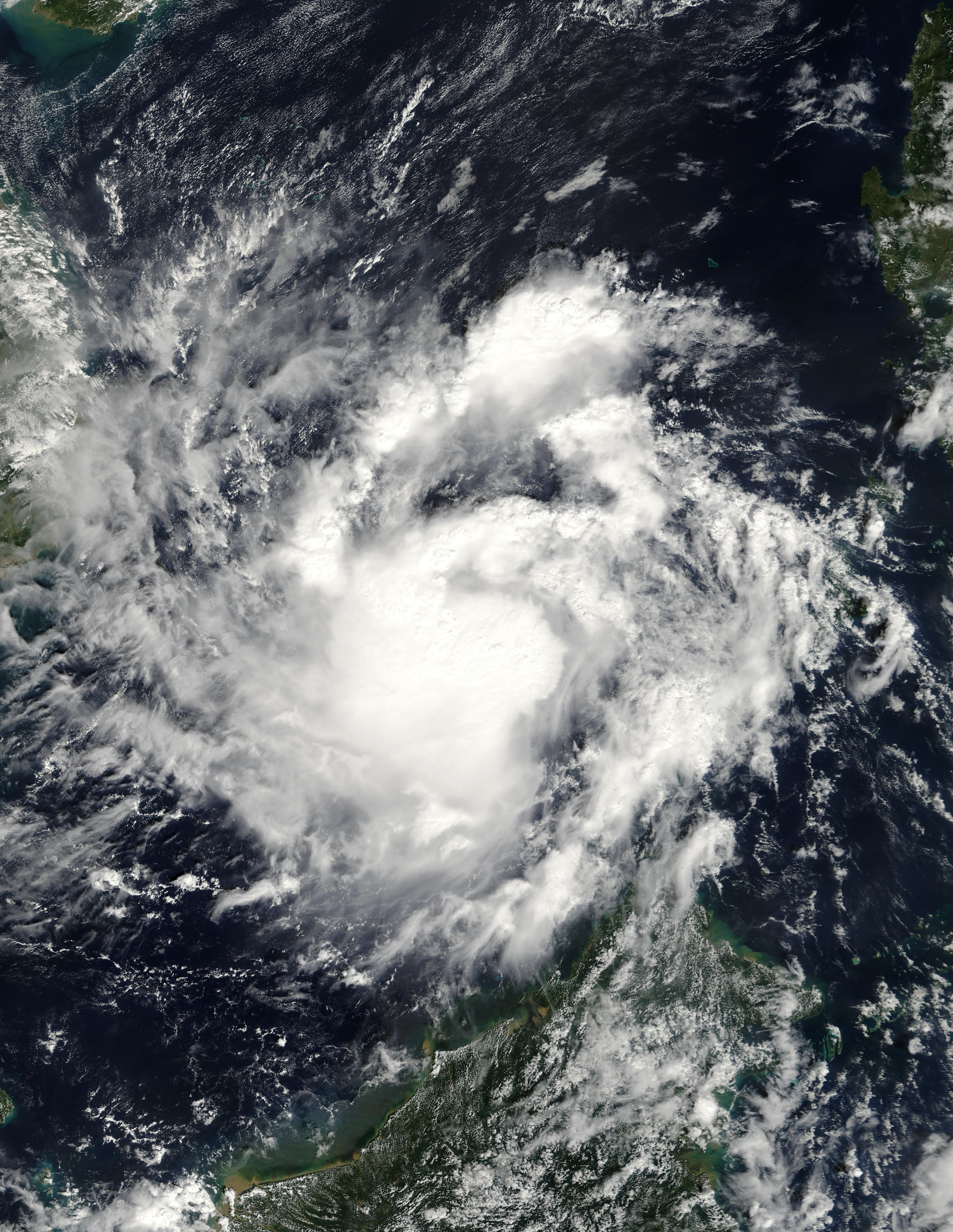
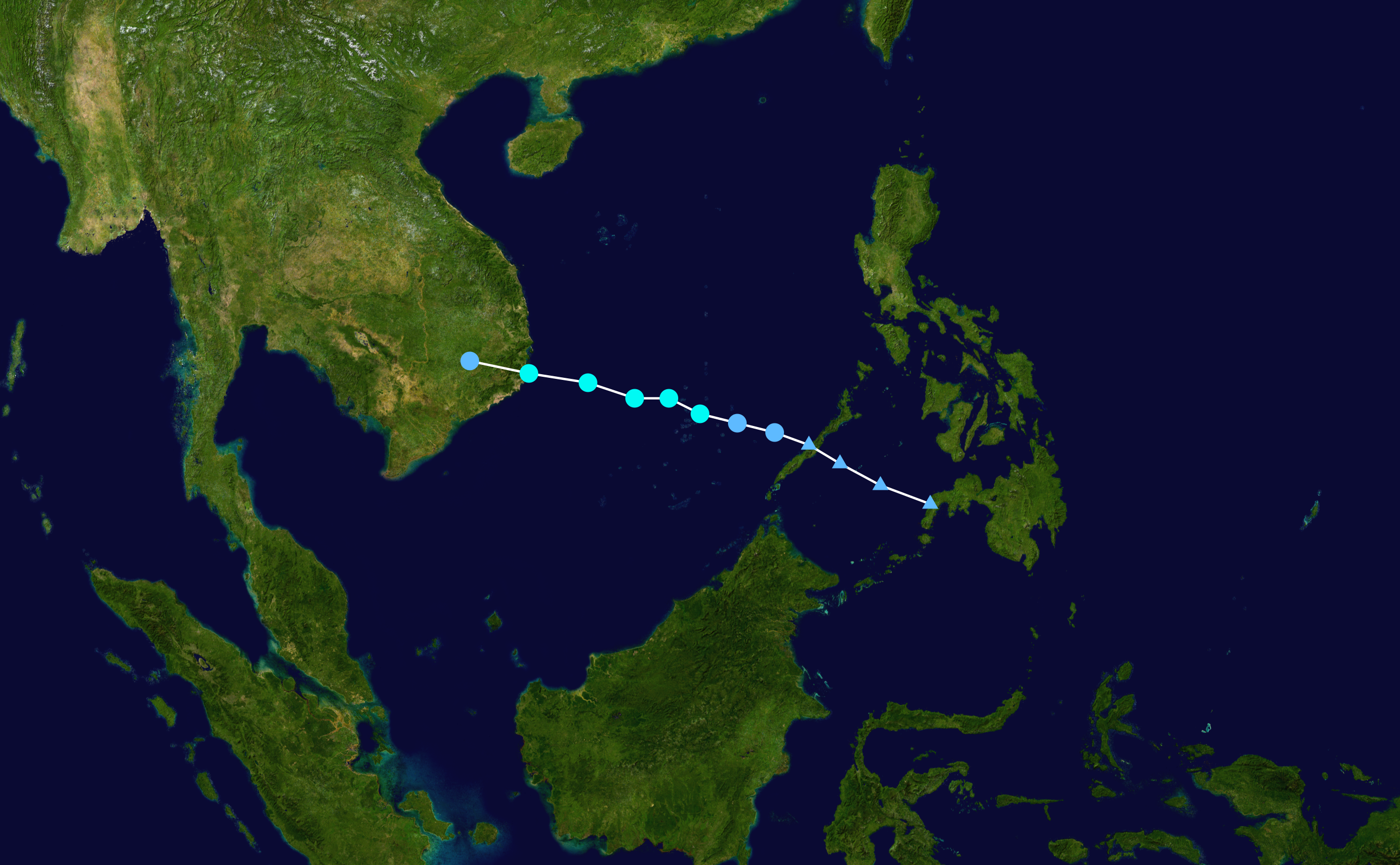
- Duration: November 14 – November 17
- Peak intensity: 75 km/h (45 mph) (10-min); 994 hPa (mbar)

On November 12, a tropical disturbance formed to the east of Mindanao in the Philippines. Later that day, the JTWC assessed the disturbances' chances of forming into a significant tropical cyclone within 24 hours as Poor. The next day, as it moved towards Mindanao, PAGASA designated it as Tropical Depression Tonyo. Early on November 16, the JTWC declared the system Tropical Depression 26W. On November 16, PAGASA issued their final warning as the Depression moved to South China Sea. On November 17 the storm dissipated over Cambodia and both the JMA and JTWC issued their final warnings later that day.

A landslide triggered by Noul killed a schoolteacher as she was heading home in Quảng Ngãi Province. At least 50 rescue workers searched for her through the debris before finding her body several days later. At least 20,000 people were in need of emergency assistance in the form of food, shelter, and water following the storm. Several other people were killed by landslides and flooding. In all, Tropical Storm Noul killed 21 people in southern Vietnam. During the storm, more than 2,000 people were isolated by floodwaters. A total of 200 homes were destroyed, another 13,500 were damaged 8,879 hectares of crops were destroyed and 60 km (37 mi) of roads were submerged. Damages from the storm were estimated at VND 143 billion (US$8.4 million). Offshore, a total of 115 boats sank due to the storm.

=== Typhoon Dolphin (Ulysses) ===
- Typhoon (JMA)
- Category 2 typhoon (SSHWS)
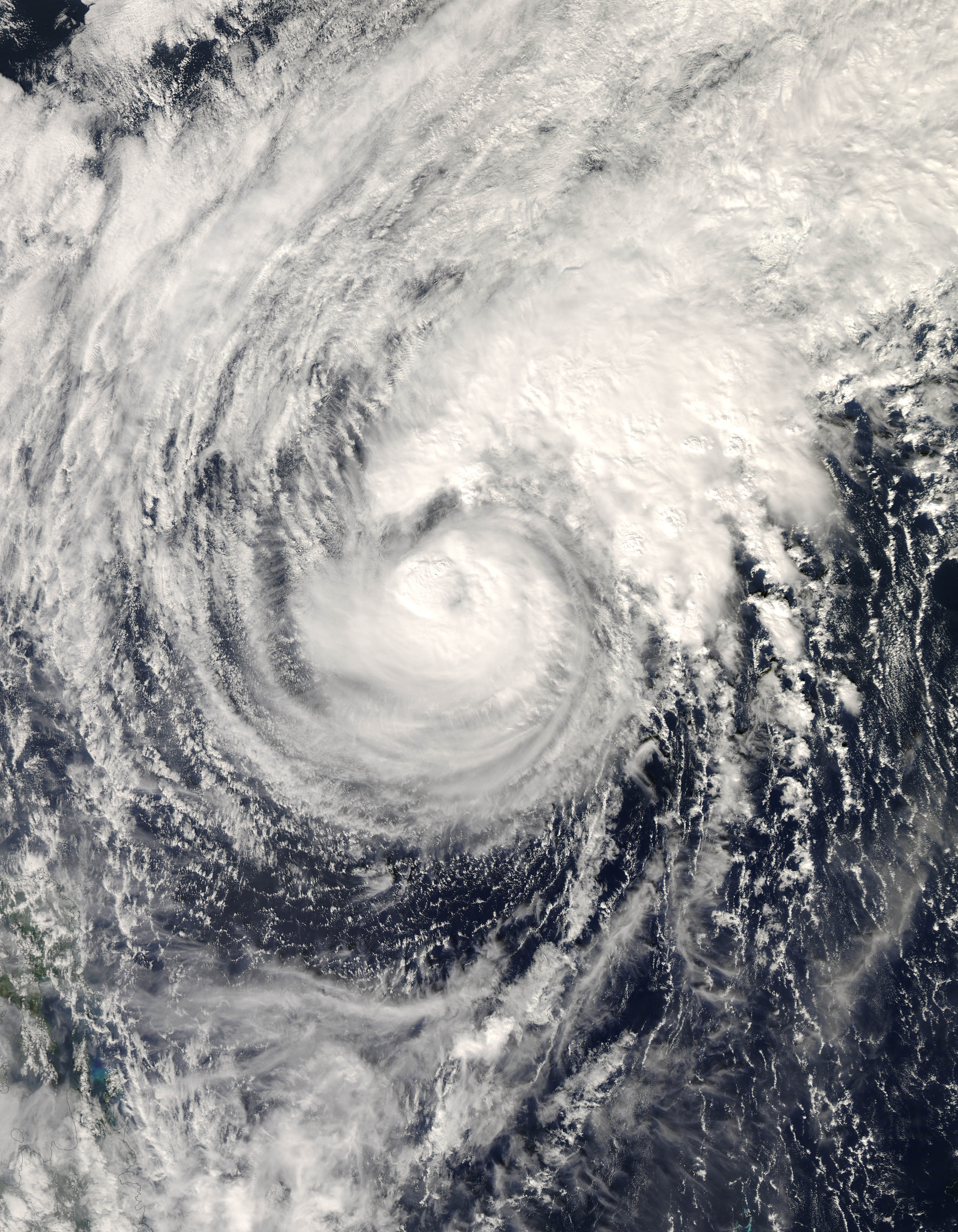
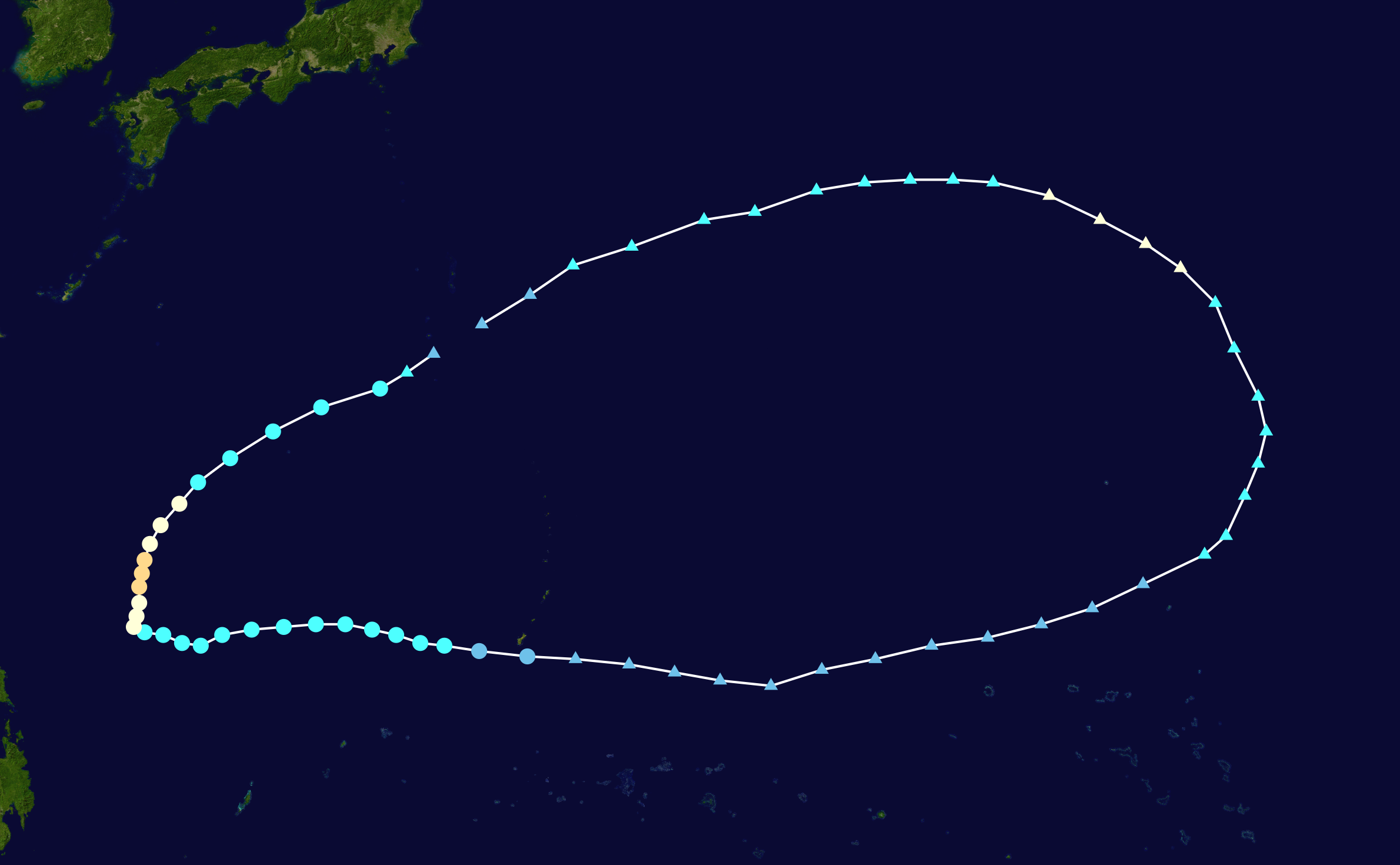
- Duration: December 11 – December 18
- Peak intensity: 130 km/h (80 mph) (10-min); 970 hPa (mbar)

A small circulation formed over a developing extratropical cyclone east of Japan on December 2. This type of formation is really rare, as the circulation moved east away from the developing cyclone and moved south on December 5. Dolphin was formerly an area of convection that had formed on the tail end of a shearline on December 7. On December 8, the storm gained more tropical characteristics, thus JMA defined it as a tropical depression. The storm then moved westward during the following days. On December 10, the JTWC upgraded the storm to Tropical Depression 27W when it was east of Guam. On December 12, 27W was upgraded to Tropical Storm Dolphin by the JMA. The name Dolphin was submitted by Hong Kong. Later that day, Dolphin entered the Philippine Area of Responsibility and named Ulysses. On December 15, the JTWC upgraded Dolphin to a typhoon. The JMA also upgraded Dolphin to a typhoon several hours later. On December 16, the JMA downgraded Dolphin to a severe tropical storm. Both agencies issued their final advisories on Dolphin on December 18 as it transitioned into an extratropical cyclone.

=== Other systems ===
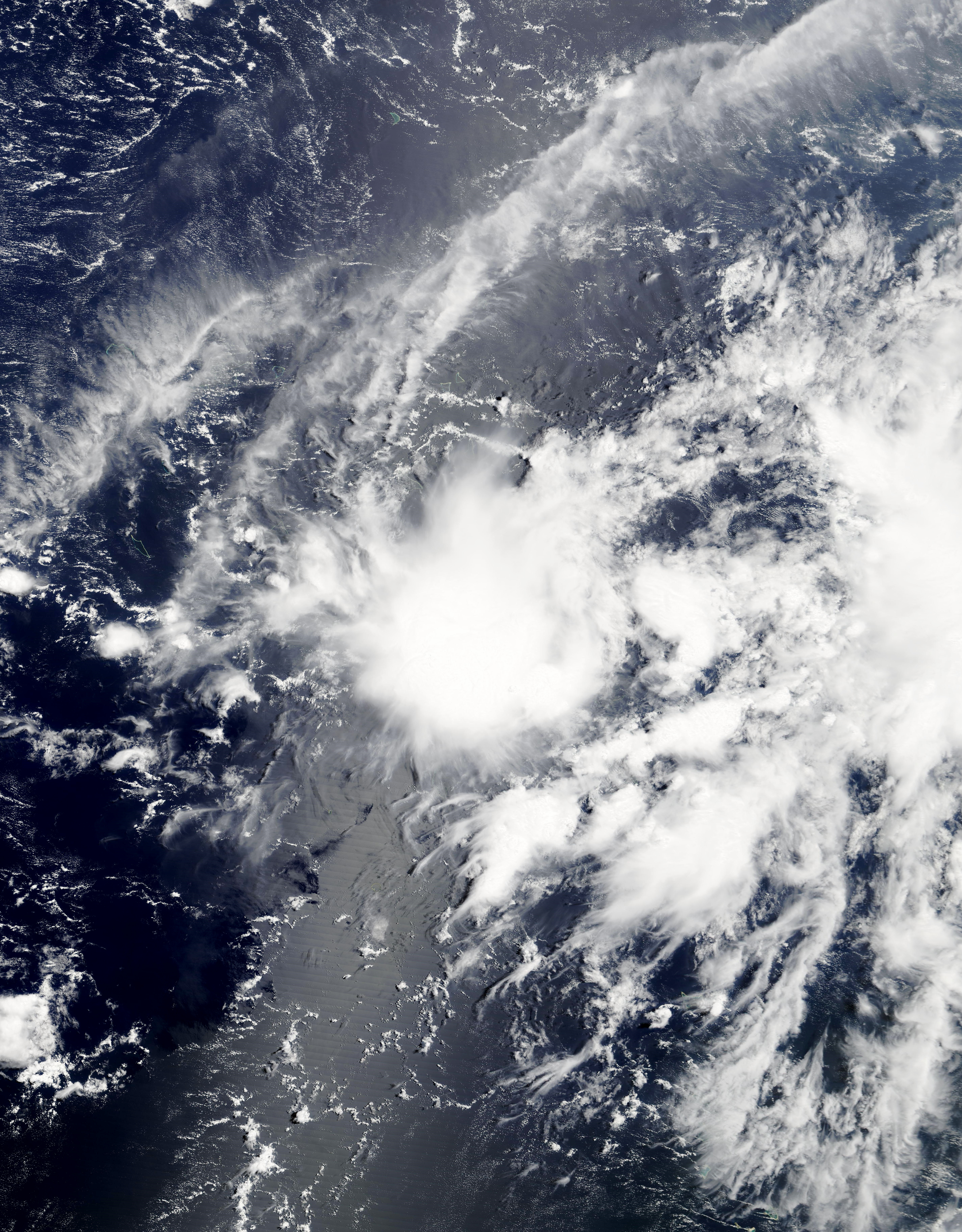
The remmants of former Tropical Storm Kika after regenerating back into a tropical depression on August 15

The following tropical depressions are left unmonitored by the JTWC.

- A tropical depression formed in the South China Sea on January 22. It weakened into a low-pressure area on January 23, near the Vietnamese east coast.
- Another tropical depression existed between March 26 and March 27, affecting Philippines before dissipating.
- On May 27, a low-pressure area east of the Philippines strengthened into a tropical depression. At 06:00 UTC on May 28, it degenerated back to a low-pressure area.
- Another tropical depression existed near Taiwan and Ryukyu Islands on June 6 before transitioning to a frontal low on the next day.
- A tropical depression existed from July 6 to July 9 and did not affect any landmasses.
- Another tropical depression formed on July 13 and dissipated on July 15 without making landfall.
- A tropical depression formed in the Gulf of Tonkin on August 10. It made landfall in northern Vietnam on August 12 before dissipating. The tropical depression caused heavy rainfall in Vietnamese northern provinces between August 11 and August 12. It also affected China.
- From August 11 to August 15, a tropical depression existed and affected Japan and South Korea.
- Shortly after crossing the dateline, the remnants of Tropical Storm Kika entered the western Pacific basin and regenerated into a tropical depression. The depression continued to move towards the west-southwest before dissipating on August 16.
- From November 10 to November 12, a tropical depression located to the east of the Philippines existed. It stayed well from land.
- A low-pressure area formed on December 1 in the South China Sea and strengthened to a tropical depression at 00:00 UTC on the next day. It weakened back to a low-pressure area after 18 hours of formation.

== Storm names ==
Within the North-western Pacific Ocean, both the Japan Meteorological Agency (JMA) and the Philippine Atmospheric, Geophysical and Astronomical Services Administration assign names to tropical cyclones that develop in the Western Pacific, which can result in a tropical cyclone having two names. The Japan Meteorological Agency's RSMC Tokyo — Typhoon Center assigns international names to tropical cyclones on behalf of the World Meteorological Organization's Typhoon Committee, should they be judged to have 10-minute sustained windspeeds of 65 km/h (40 mph). While the Philippine Atmospheric, Geophysical and Astronomical Services Administration assigns names to tropical cyclones which move into or form as a tropical depression in their area of responsibility located between 135°E and 115°E and between 5°N-25°N even if the cyclone has had an international name assigned to it. The names of significant tropical cyclones are retired, by both PAGASA and the Typhoon Committee. Should the list of names for the Philippine region be exhausted then names will be taken from an auxiliary list of which the first ten are published each season. Unused names are marked in gray.

=== International names ===
During the season 22 named tropical cyclones developed in the Western Pacific and were named by the Japan Meteorological Agency, when it was determined that they had become tropical storms. These names were contributed to a list of a 140 names submitted by the fourteen members nations and territories of the ESCAP/WMO Typhoon Committee. During the season, the names Matmo, Nuri, Noul, and Dolphin were used for the first time after they replaced the names Chataan, Rusa, Pongsona, and Yanyan, which were retired following the 2002 and 2003 seasons.

Neoguri	Rammasun	Matmo	Halong	Nakri	Fengshen	Kalmaegi	Fung-wong	Kammuri	Phanfone	Vongfong
Nuri	Sinlaku	Hagupit	Jangmi	Mekkhala	Higos	Bavi	Maysak	Haishen	Noul	Dolphin

=== Philippines ===
Ambo	Butchoy	Cosme	Dindo	Enteng
Frank	Gener	Helen	Igme	Julian
Karen	Lawin	Marce	Nina	Ofel
Pablo	Quinta	Rolly	Siony	Tonyo
Ulysses	Vicky (unused)	Warren (unused)	Yoyong (unused)	Zosimo (unused)
Auxiliary list
Alakdan (unused)	Baldo (unused)	Clara (unused)	Dencio (unused)	Estong (unused)
Felipe (unused)	Gardo (unused)	Heling (unused)	Ismael (unused)	Julio (unused)

The Philippine Atmospheric, Geophysical and Astronomical Services Administration uses its own naming scheme for tropical cyclones in their area of responsibility. PAGASA assigns names to tropical depressions that form within their area of responsibility and any tropical cyclone that might move into their area of responsibility. Should the list of names for a given year prove to be insufficient, names are taken from an auxiliary list, the first 10 of which are published each year before the season starts. The names not retired from this list will be used again in the 2012 season. This is the same list used in the 2004 season, except for Ulysses, Vicky and Warren, which replaced Unding, Violeta and Winnie respectively. A storm was named Ulysses for the first time. Names that were not assigned are marked in gray.

=== Retirement ===
During this season, PAGASA announced that they were going to retire the names Cosme and Frank due to the extensive damage and loss of life that they caused. In June 2012 the names Carina and Ferdie were chosen to replace these names for future seasons. No international names were retired following the 2008 season.

== Season effects ==
This table will list all the storms that developed in the northwestern Pacific Ocean west of the International Date Line and north of the equator during 2008. It will include their intensity, duration, name, areas affected, deaths, and damage totals. Classification and intensity values will be based on estimations conducted by the JMA. All damage figures will be in 2008 USD. Damages and deaths from a storm will include when the storm was a precursor wave or an extra tropical low.

Name	Dates	Peak intensity			Areas affected	Damage (USD)	Deaths	Ref(s).
Name	Dates	Category	Wind speed	Pressure	Areas affected	Damage (USD)	Deaths	Ref(s).
01W	January 13–18	Tropical depression	55 km/h (34 mph)	1,004 hPa (29.65 inHg)	Philippines, Malaysia	None	None	
TD	January 22–23	Tropical depression	Not specified	1,006 hPa (29.71 inHg)	None	None	None	
TD	March 26–27	Tropical depression	Not specified	1,006 hPa (29.71 inHg)	Philippines	None	None	
Neoguri (Ambo)	April 13–20	Typhoon	150 km/h (93 mph)	960 hPa (28.35 inHg)	Philippines, China	$65 million	26	
Rammasun (Butchoy)	May 7–13	Violent typhoon	195 km/h (121 mph)	915 hPa (27.02 inHg)	Philippines, Japan	$9.6 million	4	
Matmo (Dindo)	May 14–17	Severe tropical storm	95 km/h (59 mph)	992 hPa (29.29 inHg)	Philippines, Japan	None	None	
Halong (Cosme)	May 14–20	Severe tropical storm	110 km/h (68 mph)	970 hPa (28.64 inHg)	Philippines, Japan	$100 million	61	
Nakri (Enteng)	May 26 – June 3	Very strong typhoon	185 km/h (115 mph)	930 hPa (27.46 inHg)	Mariana Islands, Japan	None	None	
TD	May 27–28	Tropical depression	Not specified	1,006 hPa (29.71 inHg)	Philippines	None	None	
TD	June 6	Tropical depression	Not specified	1,006 hPa (29.71 inHg)	Taiwan, Ryukyu Islands	None	None	
Fengshen (Frank)	June 17–25	Very strong typhoon	165 km/h (103 mph)	945 hPa (27.91 inHg)	Philippines, China	$430 million	1,371	
Gener	July 4–8	Tropical depression	55 km/h (34 mph)	1,000 hPa (29.53 inHg)	China	None	None	
TD	July 6–9	Tropical depression	Not specified	1,004 hPa (29.65 inHg)	None	None	None	
TD	July 13–15	Tropical depression	Not specified	1,006 hPa (29.71 inHg)	None	None	None	
Kalmaegi (Helen)	July 13–20	Typhoon	120 km/h (75 mph)	970 hPa (28.64 inHg)	Philippines, Taiwan, China, Korea, Japan	$332 million	25	
Fung-wong (Igme)	July 23–30	Typhoon	140 km/h (87 mph)	960 hPa (28.35 inHg)	Taiwan, China	$541 million	23	
Kammuri (Julian)	July 23–30	Severe tropical storm	95 km/h (59 mph)	975 hPa (28.79 inHg)	Philippines, China, Hong Kong, Taiwan, Vietnam	$200 million	204	
Phanfone	August 9–11	Severe tropical storm	95 km/h (59 mph)	996 hPa (29.41 inHg)	None	None	None	
TD	August 10–12	Tropical depression	Not specified	998 hPa (29.47 inHg)	Vietnam, China	None	None	
TD	August 11–15	Tropical depression	Not specified	1,000 hPa (29.53 inHg)	Japan, South Korea	None	None	
11W	August 12–15	Tropical depression	55 km/h (34 mph)	998 hPa (29.47 inHg)	Japan, South Korea	Minor	None	
Vongfong	August 14–17	Severe tropical storm	95 km/h (59 mph)	990 hPa (29.23 inHg)	Japan	Minor	1	
Nuri (Karen)	August 17–23	Typhoon	140 km/h (87 mph)	955 hPa (28.20 inHg)	Caroline Islands, Philippines, China	$85 million	20	
14W (Lawin)	August 26–28	Tropical depression	55 km/h (34 mph)	1,002 hPa (29.59 inHg)	Philippines, Taiwan	None	None	
Sinlaku (Marce)	September 8–21	Very strong typhoon	185 km/h (115 mph)	935 hPa (27.61 inHg)	Philippines, Taiwan, China, Japan	$1.1 billion	24	
16W	September 9–11	Tropical depression	55 km/h (34 mph)	1,002 hPa (29.59 inHg)	Japan	None	None	
17W	September 13–14	Tropical depression	45 km/h (28 mph)	1,010 hPa (29.83 inHg)	None	None	None	
Hagupit (Nina)	September 18–25	Very strong typhoon	165 km/h (103 mph)	935 hPa (27.61 inHg)	Philippines, Taiwan, China, Vietnam	$3 billion	67	
Jangmi (Ofel)	September 23 – October 1	Violent typhoon	215 km/h (134 mph)	905 hPa (26.72 inHg)	Taiwan, Japan	$87.7 million	8	
Mekkhala	September 27–30	Tropical storm	85 km/h (53 mph)	990 hPa (29.23 inHg)	Vietnam, Laos, Thailand	$6.6 million	16	
Higos (Pablo)	September 29 – October 6	Tropical storm	65 km/h (40 mph)	998 hPa (29.47 inHg)	Philippines, Taiwan, China	$6.5 million	Unknown	
22W	October 12–15	Tropical depression	55 km/h (34 mph)	1,006 hPa (29.71 inHg)	China, Vietnam	Moderate	None	
Bavi	October 18–20	Tropical storm	85 km/h (53 mph)	992 hPa (29.29 inHg)	None	None	None	
Maysak (Quinta–Siony)	November 6–14	Severe tropical storm	95 km/h (59 mph)	985 hPa (29.09 inHg)	Philippines, Vietnam	Minor	30	
Rolly	November 7–9	Tropical depression	55 km/h (34 mph)	1,006 hPa (29.71 inHg)	Philippines	None	None	
TD	November 11–12	Tropical depression	Not specified	1,004 hPa (29.65 inHg)	None	Minor	None	
Haishen	November 14–17	Tropical storm	75 km/h (47 mph)	1,004 hPa (29.65 inHg)	None	None	None	
Noul (Tonyo)	November 14–17	Tropical storm	75 km/h (47 mph)	994 hPa (29.35 inHg)	Philippines, Vietnam, Cambodia	$8.4 million	21	
TD	December 2	Tropical depression	Not specified	1,006 hPa (29.71 inHg)	None	Minor	None	
Dolphin (Ulysses)	December 11–18	Typhoon	120 km/h (75 mph)	970 hPa (28.64 inHg)	Caroline Islands, Mariana Islands, Philippines	$9,000	47	
Season aggregates
41 systems	January 13 – December 18		215 km/h (134 mph)	905 hPa (26.72 inHg)		$5.97 billion	1,936	

== See also ==
- List of Pacific typhoon seasons
- Tropical cyclones in 2008
- 2008 Pacific hurricane season
- 2008 Atlantic hurricane season
- 2008 North Indian Ocean cyclone season
- South-West Indian Ocean cyclone seasons: 2007–08, 2008–09
- Australian region cyclone seasons: 2007–08, 2008–09
- South Pacific cyclone seasons: 2007–08, 2008–09
