= List of storms named Kalmaegi =

The name Kalmaegi (Korean: 갈매기, [ka̠ɭmɛɡi]) has been used for five tropical cyclones in the Western Pacific Ocean. The name was contributed by North Korea and means seagull in Korean.

- Tropical Storm Kalmaegi (2002) (T0210, 15W) – crossed the International Date Line
- Typhoon Kalmaegi (2008) (T0807, 08W, Helen) – struck Taiwan and China
- Typhoon Kalmaegi (2014) (T1415, 15W, Luis) – a storm which brought flooding in southeast Asia during mid-September
- Typhoon Kalmaegi (2019) (T1926, 27W, Ramon) – impacted northern Philippines during mid-November
- Typhoon Kalmaegi (2025) (T2525, 31W, Tino) – a Category 3 typhoon that heavily impacted Visayas in the Philippines and Vietnam

The name Kalmaegi was retired following the 2025 Pacific typhoon season and a replacement name will be given at the 59th WMO/Typhoon Committee Annual Session in spring 2027.
