= Igme =

Igme may refer to:

- Geological and Mining Institute of Spain
- List of storms named Igme
