= Typhoon Fung-wong (2008) =

Pacific typhoon in 2008

Typhoon Fung-wong (Igme)
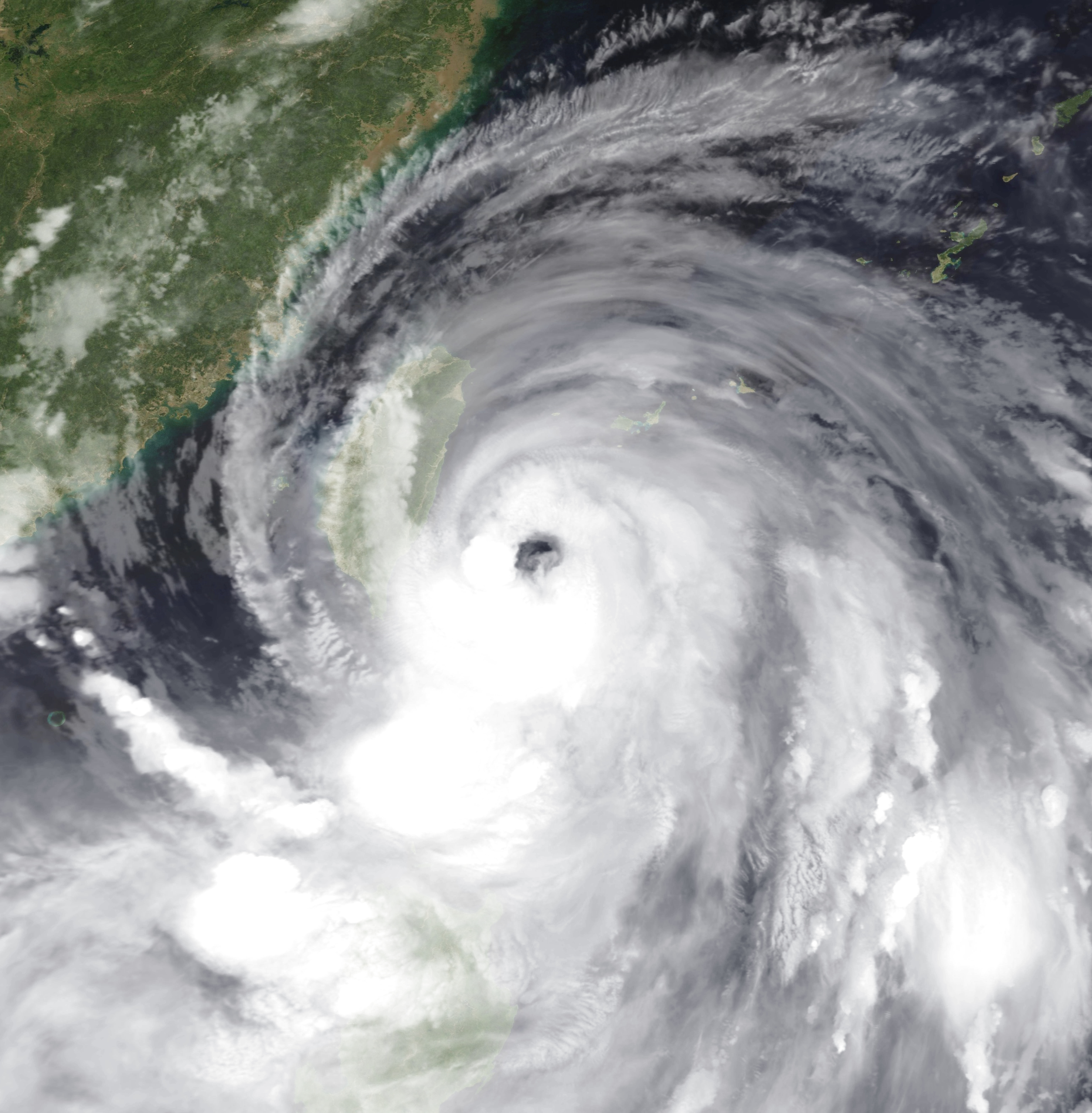
- Typhoon Fung-wong near peak intensity approaching Taiwan on July 27

Meteorological history
- Formed: July 23, 2008
- Dissipated: July 30, 2008

Typhoon
- 10-minute sustained (JMA)
- Highest winds: 140 km/h (85 mph)
- Lowest pressure: 960 hPa (mbar); 28.35 inHg

Category 2-equivalent typhoon
- 1-minute sustained (SSHWS/JTWC)
- Highest winds: 175 km/h (110 mph)
- Lowest pressure: 952 hPa (mbar); 28.11 inHg

Overall effects
- Fatalities: 23 direct
- Damage: $541 million (2008 USD)
- Areas affected: Philippines, Taiwan, and mainland China
- IBTrACS
- Part of the 2008 Pacific typhoon season

Typhoon Fung-wong, (Note: The name Fung-wong (Cantonese: 鳳凰, [fʊŋ˨ wɔːŋ˨˩]) was contributed by Hong Kong and means phoenix or refers to Lantau Peak in Cantonese.) known in the Philippines as Typhoon Igme, was a deadly typhoon in the which made landfall on Taiwan and China in late July 2008. Typhoon Fung-wong reached peak intensity of a Category 2 typhoon on the Saffir-Simpson Hurricane Scale by the Joint Typhoon Warning Center with peak winds of 95 knots (176 km/h). Damage was extensive in Taiwan, hitting little more than a week later than Typhoon Kalmaegi, but a specific cost is unknown, though later estimated at $541 million (2008 USD).

== Meteorological history ==
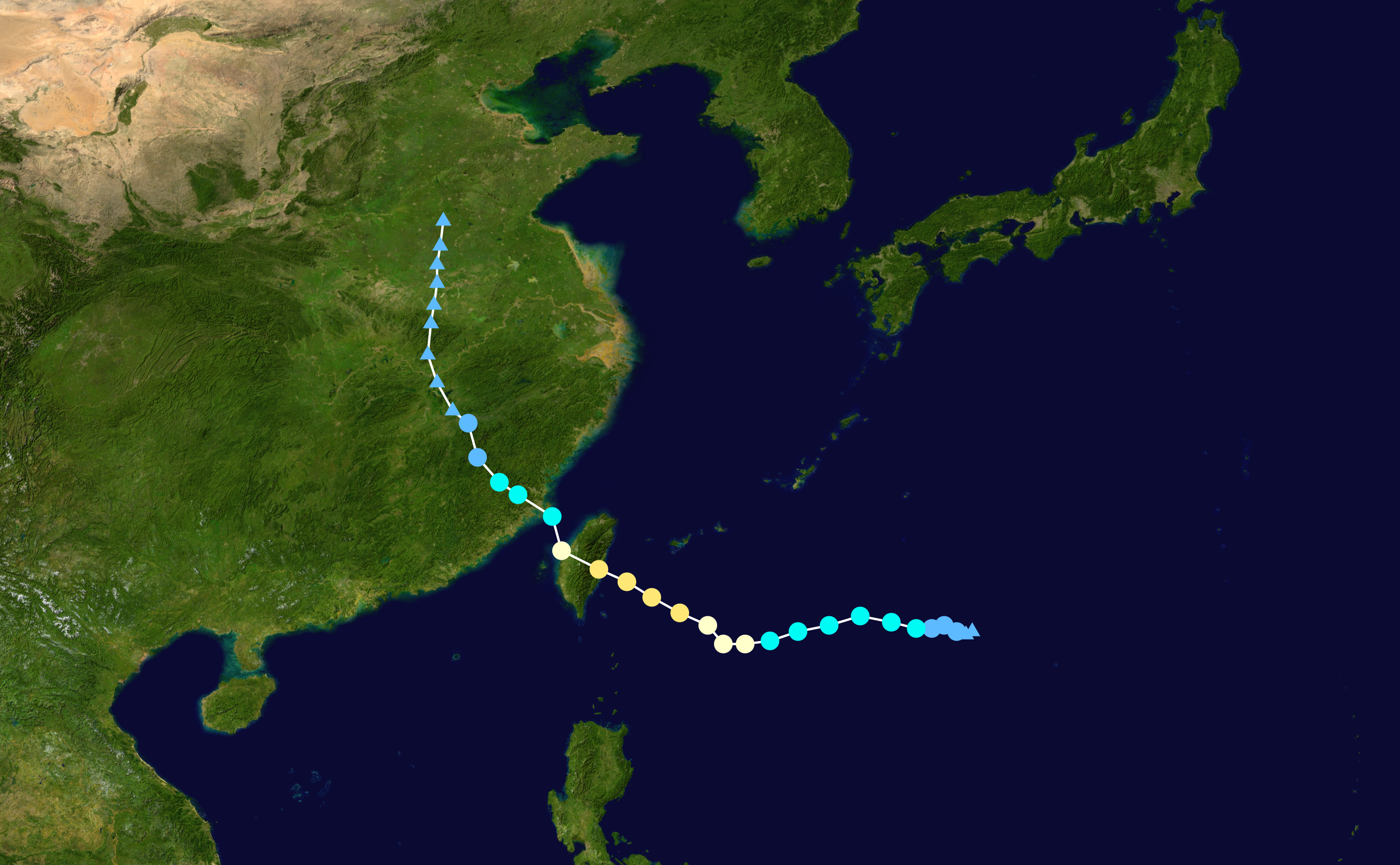
Map plotting the storm's track and intensity, according to the Saffir–Simpson scale Map key Saffir–Simpson scale Tropical depression (≤38 mph, ≤62 km/h) Tropical storm (39–73 mph, 63–118 km/h) Category 1 (74–95 mph, 119–153 km/h) Category 2 (96–110 mph, 154–177 km/h) Category 3 (111–129 mph, 178–208 km/h) Category 4 (130–156 mph, 209–251 km/h) Category 5 (≥157 mph, ≥252 km/h) Unknown Storm type Tropical cyclone Subtropical cyclone Extratropical cyclone, remnant low, tropical disturbance, or monsoon depression

On July 20, 2008, a tropical disturbance formed to the south-east of Okinawa, Japan. Later that day the Joint Typhoon Warning Center, started to issue tropical weather outlooks on the disturbance. At this time the JTWC assessed its chances of forming into a significant tropical cyclone within 24 hours as "Poor". Over the next few days as the disturbance slowly moved south west the JTWC kept assessing the disturbance chances of forming into a significant tropical cyclone as poor due to the disturbance's transition from a cold core to a warm core. Late on July 23 the JTWC upgraded the disturbances chances of becoming a significant tropical cyclone to fair. This came after the Japan Meteorological Agency had designated the disturbance as a minor tropical depression.

Early the next day the Philippine Atmospheric, Geophysical and Astronomical Services Administration (PAGASA) designated the disturbance as a tropical depression and assigned the local name of Igme to the depression. Later that morning the JTWC issued a Tropical Cyclone Formation Alert as they upgraded the disturbance's chances of becoming a significant tropical cyclone to "Good". At the same time the JMA designated the depression as a full tropical depression. Later that day the JTWC upgraded the disturbance to a tropical depression and designated it as 09W. During the morning of July 25 both the JTWC and the JMA upgraded the depression to a tropical storm, with the JMA assigning the name Fung-wong to the storm. During that day Fung-wong intensified slowly with the JMA reporting early the next day that Fung-wong had become a severe tropical storm. Later on July 26 the JTWC upgraded Fungwong to typhoon status, whilst the JMA were reporting that Fung-wong was still a severe tropical storm. The next morning the JMA upgraded Fung-wong to typhoon status, and then later that day reported that Fung-wong had reached its 10-minute peak wind speeds of 75 knots (139 km/h), (85 mph, 140 km/h). Fung-wong also reached its 1-minute sustained peak wind speeds of 95 knots (176 km/h), (110 mph, 175 km/h) which made Fung-wong a category two typhoon as it moved towards Taiwan.

Late on July 27 Fungwong made landfall on Taiwan near the border of Hualien County and Taitung County. Early the next day, as Fungwong moved towards the west through Taiwan, the JMA downgraded Fungwong to a severe tropical storm as it moved through Changhua County towards the Taiwan Strait. Fung-wong then moved into the Taiwan Strait later that morning, before being downgraded that afternoon to a Tropical Storm by the JTWC. Fungwong then made its second landfall, this time on south-east China. Later that day the JTWC issued its final advisory on Fung-wong, as the JTWC expected Fung-wong to dissipate over land during the next 12 hours. However the JMA continued to issue advisories on Fung-wong as it moved across China downgrading it to a Tropical Storm early on July 29. The JMA then kept issuing advisories on Fung-wong until early that afternoon when they downgraded Fung-wong to a tropical depression and issued their final advisory. However the JMA kept issuing warnings on the depression until it dissipated the next day.

== Preparations ==
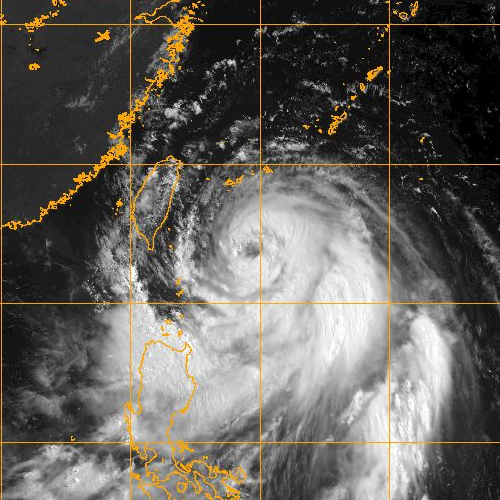
Typhoon Fung-wong approaching Taiwan on July 27

=== Taiwan ===
On July 27, Taiwan's Central Weather Bureau issued land and sea advisories for the entire main island of Taiwan. In advance of the storm's arrival in Taiwan, both Hualien County and Taitung County in eastern Taiwan called off work and classes both for the evening of July 27 as well as all day on July 28. All local governments in Taiwan proper, as well as the island county of Penghu in the Taiwan Strait have called off work and school for the 28th. Several airlines have cancelled all domestic flights for the 28th as has some international flights from Taoyuan, Kaohsiung, and Taichung. The Taiwan Railways Administration cancelled all trains running the eastern Taiwan line for the evening of the 27th and all trains nationwide where shut down until 17:00 local time (0900 UTC) on the 28th. High Speed Rail trains resumed service at 18:00.

=== Mainland China ===
Officials in Fujian Province sent out over 20 million text messages to the public, alerting them of the approaching typhoon. A total of 751,600 people were evacuated from coastal areas in Fujian, Zhejiang and Guangdong provinces.

== Impact ==
=== Taiwan ===
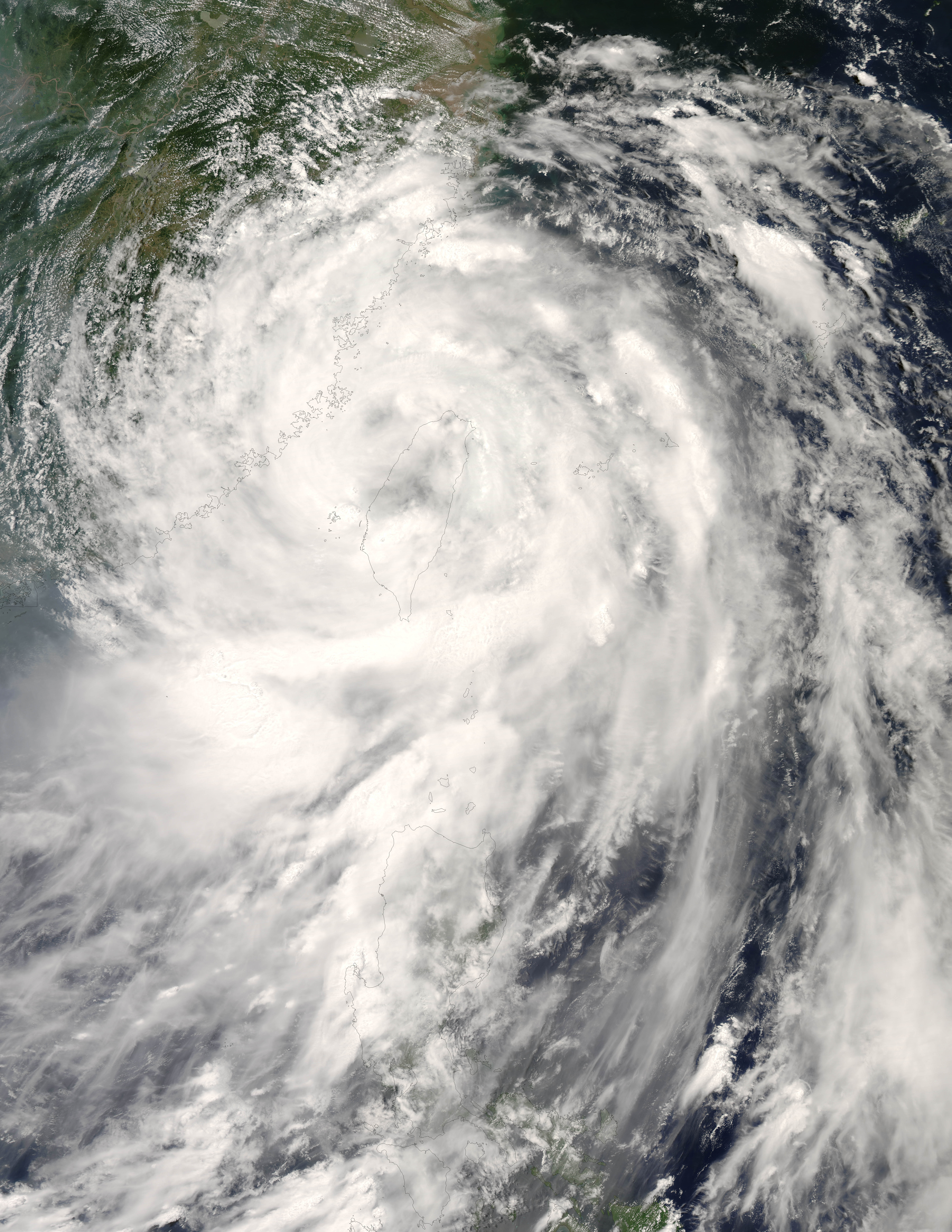
Typhoon Fung-wong over Taiwan on July 28

Early on during July 27 outer feeder bands of the storm started to strike the eastern part of the country. The storm made its first landfall at around 06:50 local time on July 28 (around 2250 UTC - July 27) near the border of Hualien County and Taitung County and emerged into the Taiwan Strait from Changhua County at 14:30 local time (0630 UTC). As the storm passed through Taiwan, more than 26,000 households had lost power, mostly in the north and east of the country. Flooding was reported in areas of eastern Taiwan during and after the Typhoon and 32 townships in the east and south had landslide warnings placed into effect during the storm.

According to the Central Weather Bureau, Taiping Mountain in Ilan County the Bureau's equipment registered over 778 mm of precipitation. Other places registering high rainfall totals include Sioulin township in Hualien County with 601 mm, Jianshih township in Hsinchu County with 510 mm and Heping Township in Taichung County (now part of Taichung City) reporting 401 mm of precipitation. The top urban areas are Hualien City with 217 mm and the capital Taipei City has seen 261 mm fall. Heaviest rainfall has been in Ilan and Hualien counties in the east while Hsinchu City through Taichung City to Yunlin County in the rain shadow have received the least rainfall tallying 15 mm or less.

As Fung-wong tracked over Taiwan, roughly 359,036 households lost power, 13,034 lost their water supply and 17,361 lost telephone service. The heaviest rainfall was recording on Tai-Ping Mountain in Yilian County at 818 mm (32.2 in). During the storm, officials evacuated 1,236 people from numerous locations which were considered to be in life-threatening situations.

=== Mainland China ===
Fung-wong brought heavy rains to mainland China, peaking at 334.5 millimetres (13.17 in) in Wenzhou, Zhejiang Province. Up to 200 millimetres (7.9 in) was estimated to have fallen across Fujian Province, leading to two locals rivers overflowing.

The JTWC reported that the typhoon, as a tropical storm made its second landfall over mainland China on July 28, 1500 UTC, around 30 nmi (56 km) south of Fuzhou. Xinhua News Agency, however, reported the storm making landfall at 10 pm local time (1400 UTC). Fujian Province was hard hit, receiving gusting winds of up to 155 km/h. 338,000 people were evacuated, and casualties are one dead and six injured. Damages in Fujian provence totaled to 503 million yuan ($73 million). Fung-wong destroyed 8,667 homes and damaged 38,300 others. An estimated 430 square kilometres (170 sq mi) of farmland were also lost. Damages were estimated at CNY 3.37 billion (US$493 million)

=== Philippines ===
Luzon in the Philippines (particularly Metro Manila) experienced torrential rain noontime local time from the outer bands, causing floods on many roads. Classes for Monday (July 28) were then suspended in twelve provinces as rains were imminent at the time. PAGASA warned small seacraft not to make voyage, as the typhoon-induced southwest monsoon is very strong. As of Late on Monday, July 28, four people had died, two were injured and 5 are still missing in Northern Luzon (mostly in Ilocos and Cordillera Administrative Region) due to the effects of the Typhoon.

According to the latest Philippine National Disaster Coordinating Council Situation Report, Igme (Fung-wong) left seven dead, two injured and three missing. Igme affected the lives of 22,079 persons in 93 barangays in three provinces. Damages caused by Igme cost almost PHP1.9 million.

== Aftermath ==
Officials sent 530 tents and CNY 5.1 million ($746,257 USD) in disaster funds to affected areas in Anhui Province.

== See also ==
- Other tropical cyclones named Fung-wong
- Other tropical cyclones named Igme
- Timeline of the 2008 Pacific typhoon season
- Typhoon Fanapi (2010) - Another typhoon affected same areas.
