= Typhoon Mindulle (2004) =

Pacific typhoon in 2004

Typhoon Mindulle (Igme)
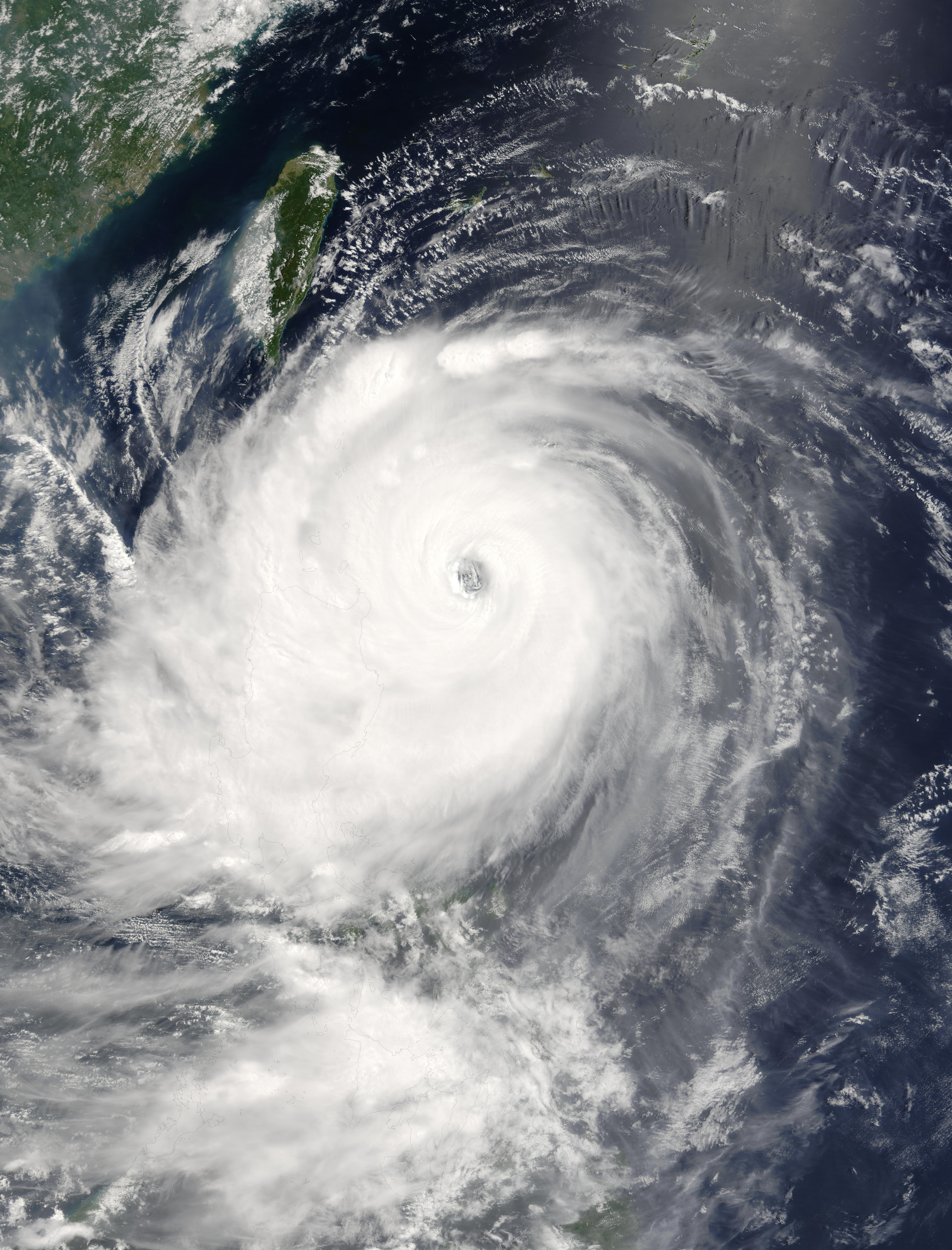
- Typhoon Mindulle at peak intensity on June 29

Meteorological history
- Formed: June 21, 2004
- Dissipated: July 4, 2004

Very strong typhoon
- 10-minute sustained (JMA)
- Highest winds: 175 km/h (110 mph)
- Lowest pressure: 940 hPa (mbar); 27.76 inHg

Category 4-equivalent typhoon
- 1-minute sustained (SSHWS/JTWC)
- Highest winds: 230 km/h (145 mph)
- Lowest pressure: 916 hPa (mbar); 27.05 inHg

Overall effects
- Fatalities: 56 total
- Damage: $833 million (2004 USD)
- Areas affected: Mariana Islands, Philippines, Taiwan, East China, Ryukyu Islands, Korea
- IBTrACS
- Part of the 2004 Pacific typhoon season

Typhoon Mindulle, known as Typhoon Igme in the Philippines was a typhoon that struck the Philippines, Taiwan and China in late June 2004, and caused extensive damage in Philippines and Taiwan.

== Meteorological history ==
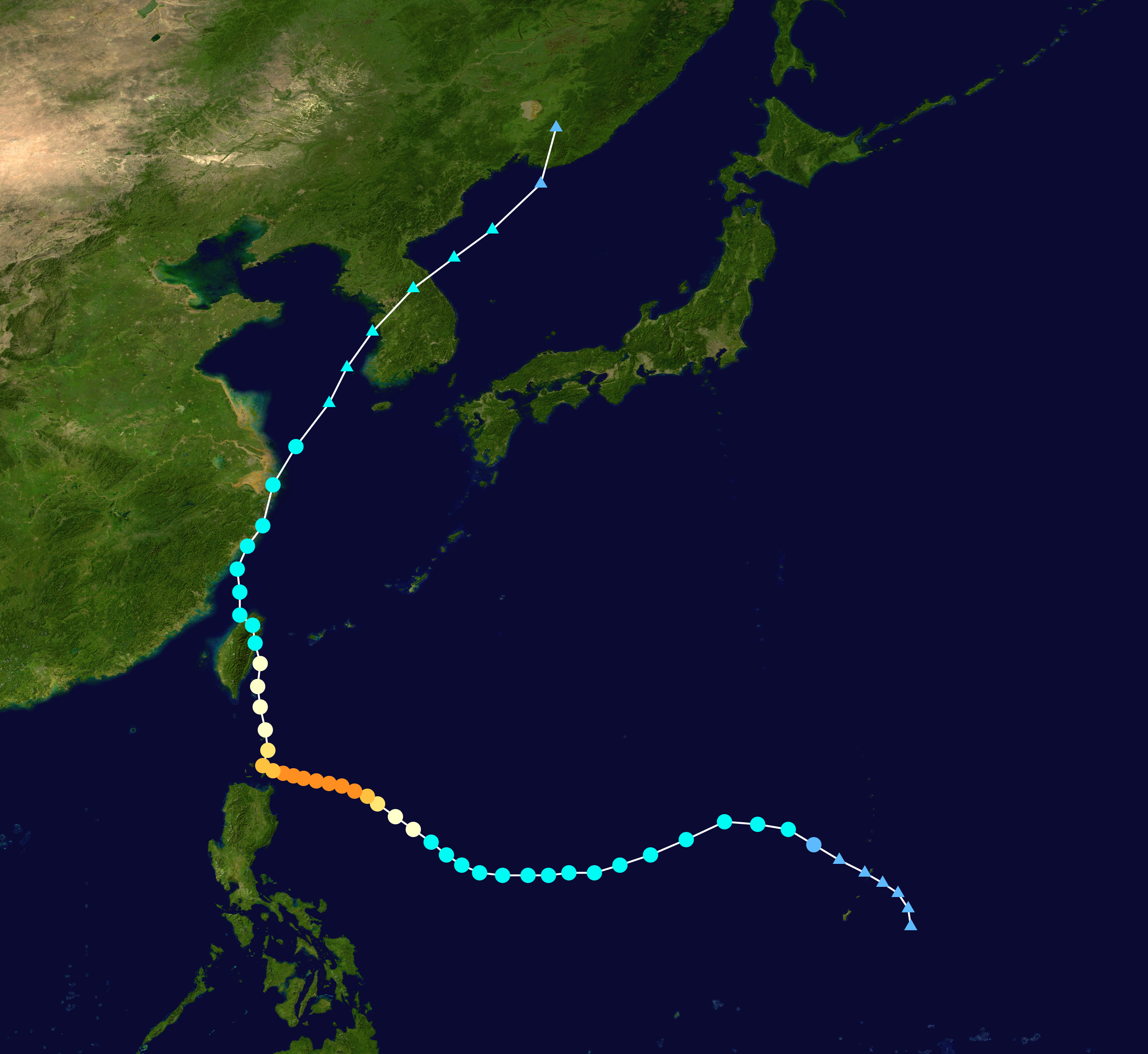
Map plotting the storm's track and intensity, according to the Saffir–Simpson scale Map key Saffir–Simpson scale Tropical depression (≤38 mph, ≤62 km/h) Tropical storm (39–73 mph, 63–118 km/h) Category 1 (74–95 mph, 119–153 km/h) Category 2 (96–110 mph, 154–177 km/h) Category 3 (111–129 mph, 178–208 km/h) Category 4 (130–156 mph, 209–251 km/h) Category 5 (≥157 mph, ≥252 km/h) Unknown Storm type Tropical cyclone Subtropical cyclone Extratropical cyclone, remnant low, tropical disturbance, or monsoon depression

The monsoon trough spawned a tropical depression on June 23 near Guam. It tracked westward, becoming a tropical storm named Mindulle that night and slowly strengthened as it continued westward due to vertical wind shear. (Note: The name Mindulle (Korean: 민들레, [mindɯɭɭe̞]) was contributed by North Korea and means dandelion (Taraxacum mongolicum) in Korean.) When the shear abated, Mindulle quickly intensified, reaching typhoon strength on June 27 and peaking at 125 knots (144 mph) on June 28. Land interaction with Luzon to its south weakened Mindulle, and the typhoon weakened as it turned northward. On July 1, Mindulle hit eastern Taiwan before accelerating to the northeast and becoming extratropical near South Korea on July 4.

== Impact ==
Mindulle caused 56 deaths and property damage estimated around $833 million (in 2004 USD) in Philippines and Taiwan. In the Philippines, floods left more than 30 dead and more than 10 missing persons. In southern Taiwan, flooding was the worst experienced in the previous 25 years, with some areas reaching 1.5 m of precipitation over several days, resulting in 22 deaths and 14 missing persons. Floods and landslides occurred at various locations.

== See also ==
- Other tropical cyclones named Mindulle
- Other tropical cyclones named Igme
