= List of storms named Gener =

The name Gener has been used for six tropical cyclones in the Philippine Area of Responsibility by PAGASA in the Western Pacific Ocean.

- Severe Tropical Storm Chanthu (2004) (T0405, 08W, Gener) – a strong tropical storm that struck the Philippines and China.
- Tropical Depression Gener (2008) – a tropical depression that was only recognized by PAGASA.
- Typhoon Saola (2012) (T1209, 10W, Gener) – a strong tropical cyclone affecting Philippines, Taiwan and China.
- Typhoon Malakas (2016) (T1616, 18W, Gener) – a powerful tropical cyclone which affected Taiwan and Japan
- Tropical Depression Gener (2020) (06W, Gener) – never affected land.
- Tropical Storm Soulik (2024) (T2415, 16W, Gener) – weak storm that made landfall in Vietnam.

Preceded by Ferdie	Pacific typhoon season names Gener	Succeeded by Helen
