= List of storms named Fung-wong =

The name Fung-wong (Cantonese: 鳳凰, [fʊŋ˨ wɔːŋ˨˩]) has been used for five tropical cyclones in the western North Pacific Ocean. The name was contributed by Hong Kong and means phoenix in Cantonese, as well as refers to Lantau Peak, the highest point in Hong Kong's Lantau Island.

- Typhoon Fung-wong (2002) (T0211, 15W, Kaka) – interacted with Typhoon Fengshen.
- Typhoon Fung-wong (2008) (T0808, 09W, Igme) – a Category 2 typhoon struck Taiwan and China
- Tropical Storm Fung-wong (2014) (T1416, 16W, Mario) – a weak but damaging tropical storm struck Philippines, Taiwan and Eastern China.
- Severe Tropical Storm Fung-wong (2019) (T1927, 28W, Sarah) – churned out of the ocean.
- Typhoon Fung-wong (2025) (T2526, 32W, Uwan) – a very large and destructive Category 4 typhoon that brushed the Philippines and Taiwan.

The name Fung-wong was retired following the 2025 Pacific typhoon season and a replacement name will be given at the 59th WMO/Typhoon Committee Annual Session in spring 2027.
