= List of storms named Kai-tak =

The name Kai-tak (Cantonese: 啟德, [kʰɐi˧˥ tak˧]) was used for four tropical cyclones in the West Pacific Ocean. Kai-tak, contributed by Hong Kong, refers to Kai Tak Airport.

- Typhoon Kai-tak (2000) (T0004, 06W, Edeng) – brushed the coasts of mainland China and Taiwan.
- Typhoon Kai-tak (2005) (T0521, 22W) – late-season storm that made landfall in Vietnam.
- Typhoon Kai-tak (2012) (T1213, 14W, Helen) – minimal typhoon that made landfall in the Philippines and China.
- Tropical Storm Kai-tak (2017) (T1726, 32W, Urduja) – crossed the Philippines as a tropical depression and regenerated into a tropical storm in the South China Sea.

The name Kai-tak was retired after the 2017 season and replaced with Yun-yeung (Cantonese: 鴛鴦, [jyːn˥ jœːŋ˥]), which refers to the mandarin duck in Cantonese and a popular drink in Hong Kong.

•Tropical Storm Yun-yeung (2023)

== e also ==
- Cyclone Khai-Muk (2 008) – a North Indian Ocean tropical cyclone with a similar name.
