= List of storms named Ferdie =

The name Ferdie has been used for four tropical cyclones in the Philippine Area of Responsibility by PAGASA in the Western Pacific Ocean. It replaced the name Frank after it was retired following the 2008 Pacific typhoon season.

- Typhoon Vicente (2012) (T1208, 09W, Ferdie) – Regarded as the strongest storm to affect Hong Kong and Macau in more than ten years.
- Typhoon Meranti (2016) (T1614, 16W, Ferdie) – One of the most intense typhoons on record, striking Batanes, Taiwan, and Fujian Province.
- Severe Tropical Storm Mekkhala (2020) (T2006, 07W, Ferdie) – A severe tropical storm that affected China.
- Typhoon Bebinca (2024) (T2413, 14W, Ferdie) – Most intense typhoon to hit Shanghai since 1949.

Preceded by Edring	Pacific typhoon season names Ferdie	Succeeded by Gener
