= Typhoon Kai-tak (2012) =

Pacific typhoon in 2012

Typhoon Kai-tak (Helen)
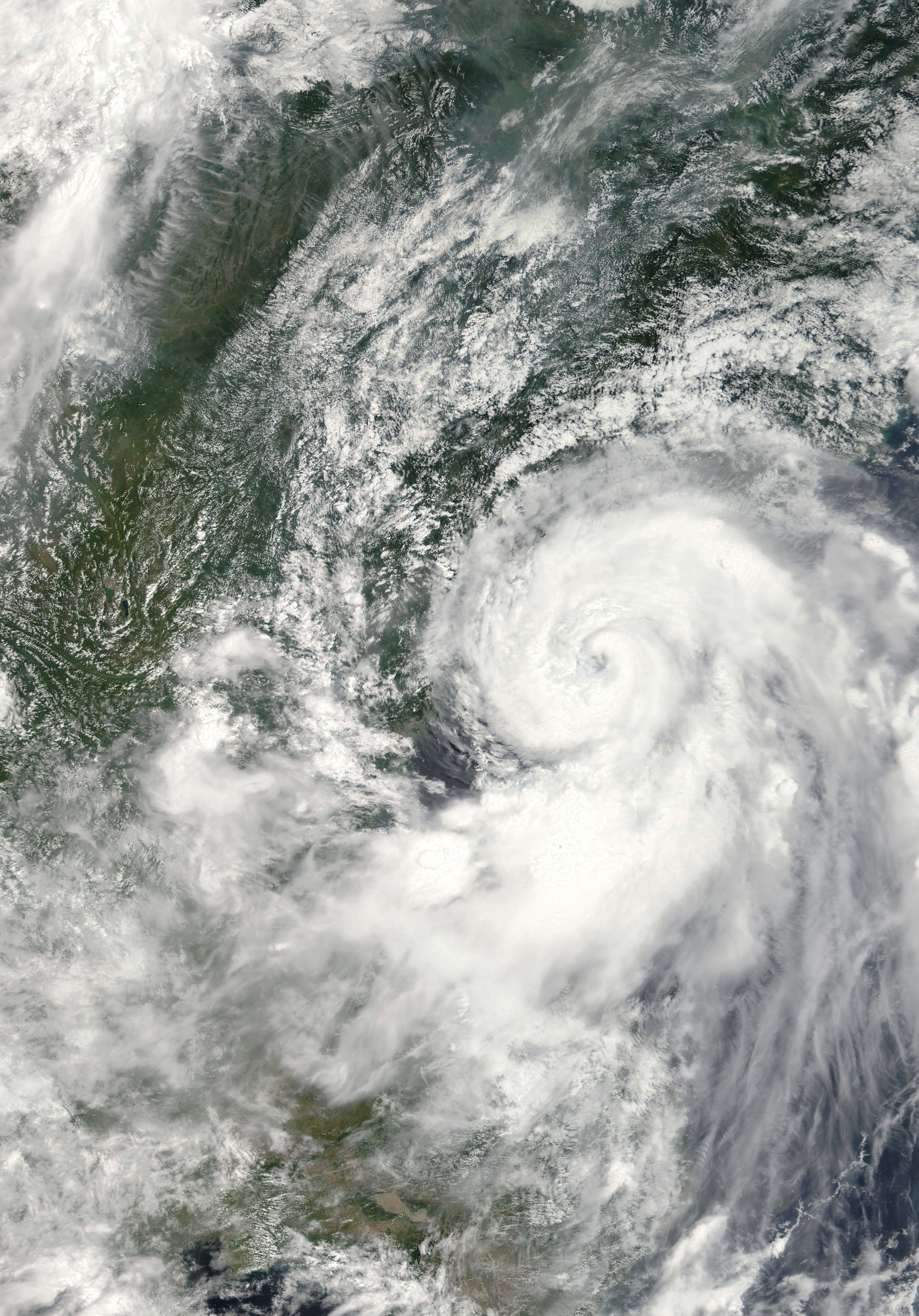
- Typhoon Kai-tak at peak intensity making landfall in China on August 17

Meteorological history
- Formed: August 12, 2012
- Dissipated: August 18, 2012

Typhoon
- 10-minute sustained (JMA)
- Highest winds: 120 km/h (75 mph)
- Lowest pressure: 970 hPa (mbar); 28.64 inHg

Category 1-equivalent typhoon
- 1-minute sustained (SSHWS/JTWC)
- Highest winds: 120 km/h (75 mph)
- Lowest pressure: 974 hPa (mbar); 28.76 inHg

Overall effects
- Fatalities: 41 total
- Damage: $765 million (2012 USD)
- Areas affected: Philippines, South China (particularly Hainan), Vietnam, Laos
- IBTrACS
- Part of the 2012 Pacific typhoon season

Typhoon Kai-tak, known in the Philippines as Severe Tropical Storm Helen, was a mild tropical cyclone that affected the Philippines, South China, Vietnam and Laos in mid-August 2012. It was the seventh typhoon and the thirteenth named storm of the 2012 Pacific typhoon season. The storm killed 41 people and caused a sum of US$765 million in losses.

Kai-tak can be tracked back to the broad area of disturbance embedded in a monsoonal trough that was first spotted, early on August 10. It was only at midnight, on August 16, when the JMA officially declared Kai-tak a typhoon. On the morning of August 17, the wind speed dropped to 60 knots (110 km/h; 69 mph) and was no longer a typhoon. The typhoon caused heavy damage in China's two provinces, killing four people and causing huge economic loss. Kai-tak slammed the northern Philippines triggering flash floods and landslides and killing at least ten people, one week after deadly monsoon rains battered the country. In Vietnam, Kai-tak has stormed across the country's north bringing high winds and floods to several areas including the capital Hanoi.

== Meteorological history ==
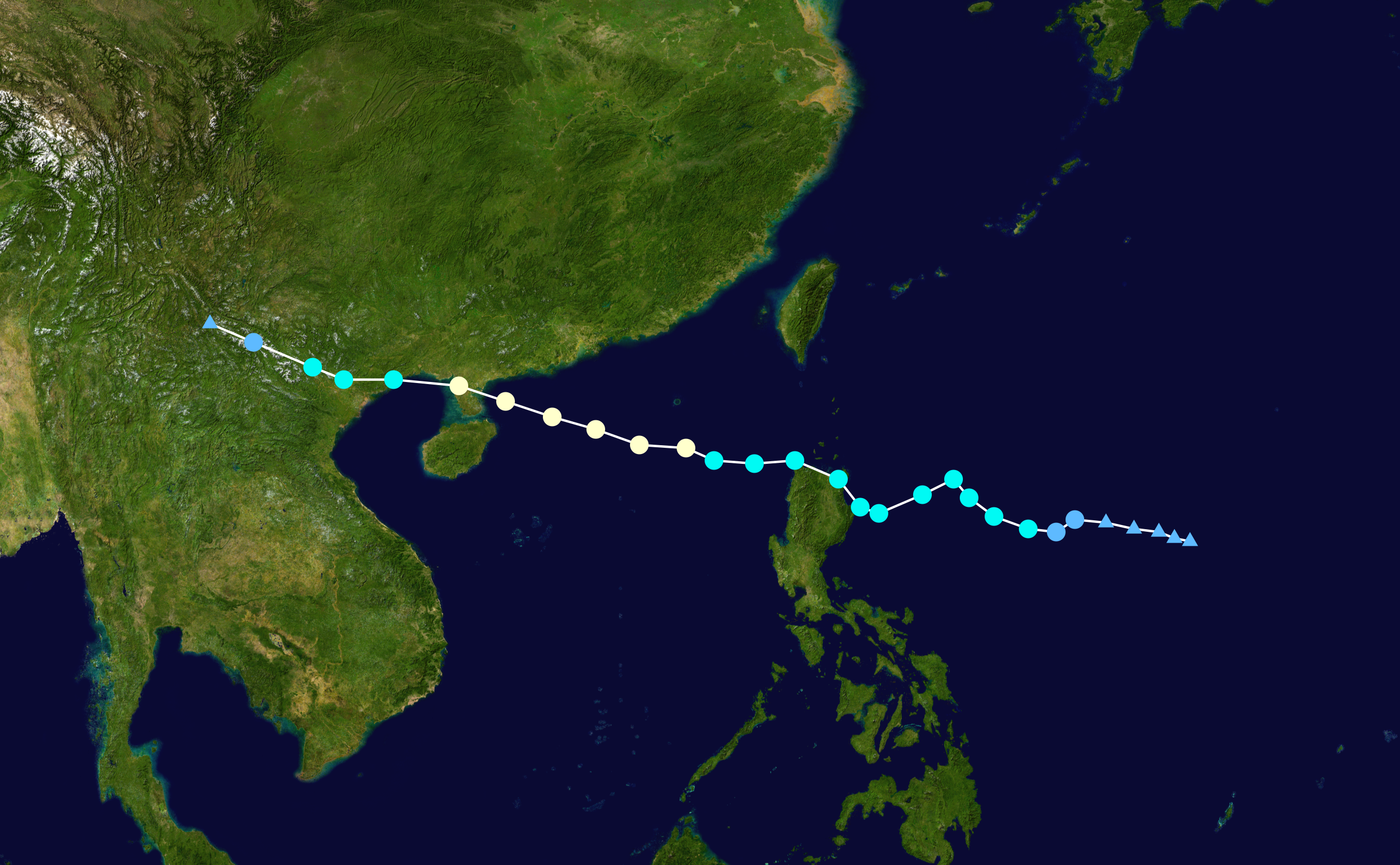
Map plotting the storm's track and intensity, according to the Saffir–Simpson scale Map key Saffir–Simpson scale Tropical depression (≤38 mph, ≤62 km/h) Tropical storm (39–73 mph, 63–118 km/h) Category 1 (74–95 mph, 119–153 km/h) Category 2 (96–110 mph, 154–177 km/h) Category 3 (111–129 mph, 178–208 km/h) Category 4 (130–156 mph, 209–251 km/h) Category 5 (≥157 mph, ≥252 km/h) Unknown Storm type Tropical cyclone Subtropical cyclone Extratropical cyclone, remnant low, tropical disturbance, or monsoon depression

The origins of Kai-tak can be tracked back to the broad area of disturbance embedded in a monsoonal trough that was first spotted, early on August 10. By the next day, the convection deepened and a weak low-level circulation center was spotted with winds of up to 20 knots (37 km/h; 23 mph). A Tropical Rainfall Measuring Mission pass revealed that the convection around the system was very loosely organised and the banding was relatively weak. By midnight, that day, the Japan Meteorological Agency (JMA) started tracking the system as a weak Tropical Depression with winds under 30 knots. A couple of hours later, the Joint Typhoon Warning Center (JTWC) issued a Tropical cyclone formation alert (TCFA) estimating winds of up to 22 knots (41 km/h; 25 mph). As the storm was also in the Philippine Atmospheric, Geophysical and Astronomical Services Administration (PAGASA)'s area of Responsibility, they started issuing advisories on the system, thus naming it Helen. By noon, on August 12, the JMA confirmed that the depression has reached a windspeed of 30 knots (56 km/h; 35 mph). As opposed to this, in their first advisory on the system, the JTWC said that the storm had winds of up to 25 knots only. Only late that night, did the JTWC confirm winds of 30 knots, based on new microwave imagery and satellite data. The storm was moving to the west at 12 knots (22 km/h; 14 mph) at the moment. At midnight, the JMA reported winds of 35 knots (65 km/h; 40 mph), stating that the depression had intensified into a tropical storm, thus officially naming it Kai-tak. (Note: The name Kai-tak (Cantonese: 啟德, [kʰɐi˧˥ tak˧]) was contributed by Hong Kong and refers to Kai Tak Airport in Cantonese.) At 09:00 UTC, on August 13, the JTWC confirmed the same. At that time, the system had a broad, partially exposed low-level circulation center (LLCC) with deep convection persisting along the western periphery. Later the same day, according to JMA, the storm reached a maximum sustained wind speed of 50 knots (93 km/h; 58 mph), thus making it a Severe Tropical Storm.

The storm continued tracking northwestward and was located approximately 400 nautical miles (740 km; 460 mi) northeast of Manila, Philippines. Infrared imagery revealed that deep convection persisted along the southwestern periphery of the LLCC. Though the storm entered warm watered off the Philippine coast, it failed to intensify rapidly as it was located along the southern periphery of a deep-layered subtropical ridge and was experiencing moderate vertical wind shear. The JTWC did not expect the storm to strengthen any further since it would start interacting with the nearby landmass. On August 14, the LLCC of the storm passed under the deepest convection, however, it failed to intensity because an anticyclone that was located to the northeast of Kai-tak. Albeit the ample outflow, no good convection developed to the northern half of the system due to the shear caused by the anticyclone. At this moment, Kai-tak was expected to rapidly drift eastward due to the persistent subtropical ridge. The JTWC expected Kai-tak to become a typhoon within 48 hours due to warm sea-surface temperatures, and then make landfall. By the night of August 14, Kai-tak tracked westward at 06 knots (11 km/h; 6.9 mph) and the LLCC became embedded within central dense overcast convection. The storm became more consolidated as a result. Fragmented concentric deep convection surrounded the LLCC. Also, the anticyclone to the east of the system weakened thus reducing the wind shear affecting Kai-tak. The wind speed then rose to approximately 55 knots (102 km/h; 63 mph). By the next day, the Kai-tak accelerated towards the Philippines. The LLCC started interacting with the northern coast of the island nation. The deep convection continued to build along with the strong equatorward outflow. The storm, however, produced no poleward outflow. Due to the sudden rise in trackspeed, the JTWC estimated a landfall within 12 hours.

On the night of August 15, the infrared satellite imagery showed that convective bands have deepened and wrapped tighter into the LLCC and an excellent equatoward outflow. The wind speed was estimated at 65 knots (120 km/h; 75 mph), which is equivalent to a minimal category 1 typhoon on the SSHS. Kai-tak was expected to continue intensifying before making landfall over China, and then decay rapidly due to land interaction. According to reports the next morning, Kai-tak continued drifting westward at about 13 knots (24 km/h; 15 mph). Though the bulk on convection remained to the southern semi-circle, deep convective rainbands have developed over the northern periphery. Over the past 12 hours, the storm rapidly moved west, into china and was expected to make landfall soon. Kai-tak was located along the southern periphery of a deep subtropical ridge positioned over southeast China. The storm continued speeding towards China and by the night of August 16, it was drifting west at nearly 14 knots (26 km/h; 16 mph). Infrared imagery showed that the cloud-top temperatures were starting to drop. The vertical wind shear near Kai-tak had weakened dramatically. However, the storm maintained the same wind speed. The JTWC announced that the storm would start weakening rapidly within 12 hours due to land interaction. It was only at midnight, on August 16, when the JMA officially declared Kai-tak a typhoon. By then, the system sped up towards landmass. It was drifting west at over 16 knots (30 km/h; 18 mph), poised to make landfall over the Leizhou Peninsula over the next 12 hours, cross the Gulf of Tonkin, before making a second and final landfall into northern Vietnam to the east of Hanoi. At the same time, the PAGASA issued their last warning on Kai-tak, otherwise known as Helen, locally, as it left the Philippine area of Responsibility.

On the morning of August 17, Kai-tak made landfall over the Leizhou peninsula, as expected. It maintained the same intensity and was expected to track west-northwestward under the influence of the subtropical ridge. Within 6 hours, Kai-tak made a second landfall over the northeast coast of Vietnam and has weakened slightly. The windspeed dropped to 60 knots (110 km/h; 69 mph) and was no longer a typhoon. Kai-tak was expected to weaken rapidly thereafter. Later that night, the JTWC issued their final warning on the system as it weakened further and sped up inland. They expected the system to dissipate within 24 hours. However, the JMA stopped tracking the storm early the next morning, no longer considering it a tropical cyclone.

== Preparations ==
=== Hong Kong ===
On August 15, The Hong Kong Observatory issued the Standby Signal, No. 1 warning regarding Kai-tak as an advisory to the public to closely follow weather reports before flying. The next day, the observatory hoisted the Strong Wind Signal, No. 3 for strong wind, as the storm came within 500 km of the region. At 22:15 the Typhoon signal Number 8 was issued which means winds speeds from 63 to 117 km/h were expected in Hong Kong. At 6:20AM the typhoon signal was lowered to Signal number 3 as Kai-tak was moving away from Hong Kong. Hong Kong's flag carrier Cathay Pacific also announced that they will be temporarily suspending services to the region due to the typhoon. Hong Kong International Airport had some flight cancellations during Typhoon Kai-tak.

=== China ===
On August 15, The national disaster relief authority of China issued a fourth-level alert, predicting that the storm may hit the coastal areas of the provinces of Guangdong and Fujian. Warnings have been issued to the Pearl River Delta forecasting rainfalls up to 400 millimetres (16 in). The agency asked all ships to return to port, reinforce outdoor structures, and evacuate workers from offshore oil platforms.

=== Vietnam ===
On August 16, The Central Steering Committee for Flood and Storm Prevention and Control stated that preparations need to be made regarding the approaching storm. The committee asked all boats at sea to remain well informed about the storm. They predicted winds of up to 75 kilometres per hour (47 mph).

== Impact ==
=== Philippines ===
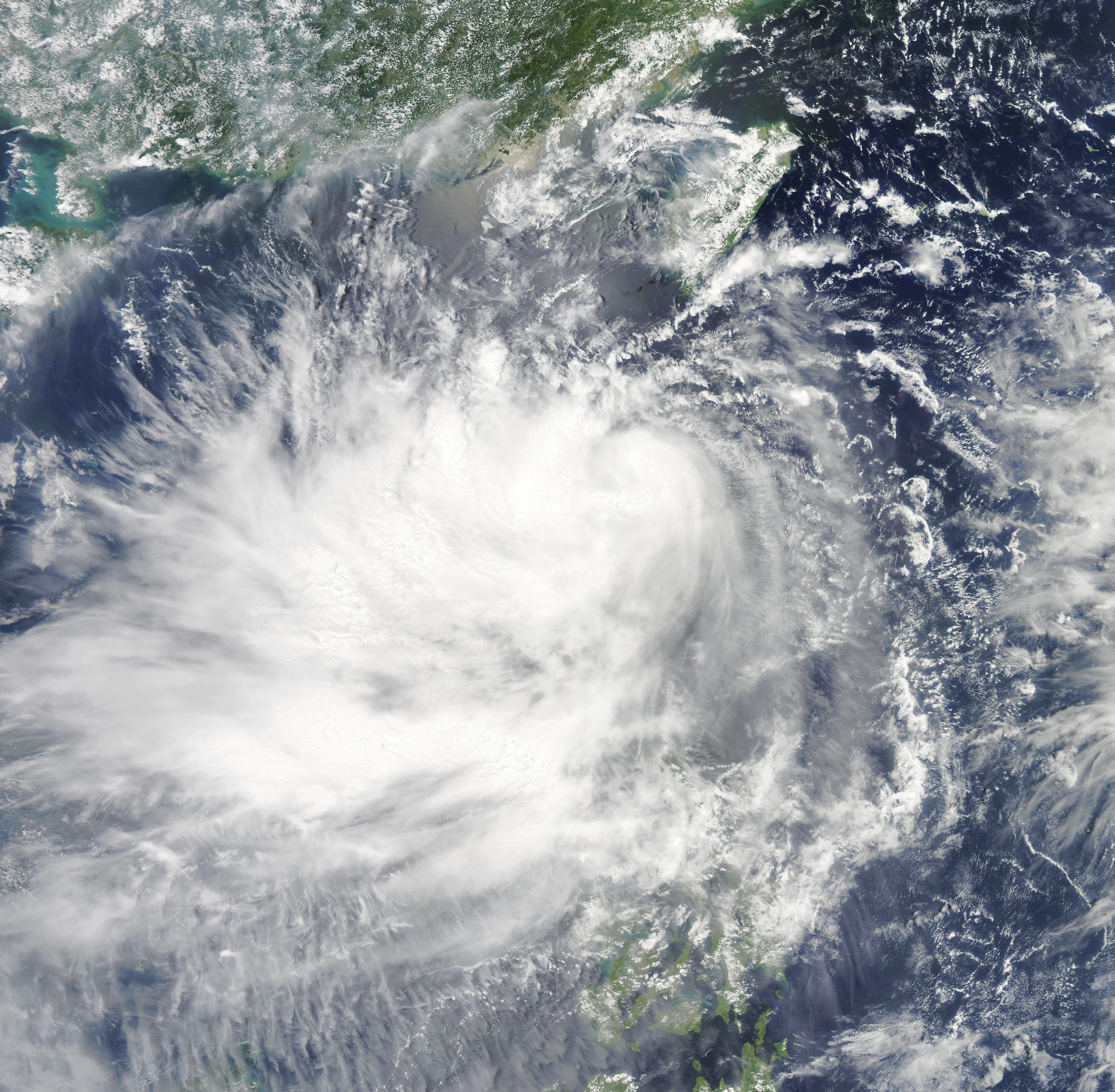
Tropical Storm Kai-tak affecting Luzon on August 15

Early on August 16, Tropical Storm Kai-tak slammed the northern Philippines triggering flash floods and landslides and killing at least three people, one week after deadly monsoon rains battered the country, disaster relief officials said. Twenty northern provinces had been placed under storm warnings before the storm hit. The Office of Civil Defence said one man drowned when he suffered a seizure and fell into a flooded rice field in the province of Pangasinan and another drowned while crossing a swollen river on Tuesday in Ilocos Norte province. Another man died from electrocution in Naguilian town in nearby La Union province, said Superintendent Jovencio Badua, a regional police spokesman. At least 3,555 people were evacuated from their homes in La Union and Pangasinan because of flash floods while several highways were cut off because of landslides, Badua said. By that night, the storm left behind ten dead in the Philippines. Economic loss across the nation reached PHP125 million (US$2.96 million). The storm blew out of the Philippines offering some relief for millions of people struggling to recover from a few weeks of monsoon rains that earlier claimed 109 lives. But more than the death toll, a foreign organisation warned the floods posed a continuing and major problem to the three million people who were displaced from their homes, almost one million of whom had sought refuge in temporary evacuation centres. The NDRRMC said it was still providing relief aid to nearly a million people impacted by last week's floods, including more than 216,000 at evacuation centres. “The need is massive and urgent, millions of people are suffering the miserable consequence of these floods and we must try to reach them before the rains hit again,” Anna Liendfors, the country representative of Save the Children appealed. At the same time, weathermen warned residents living in low-lying and mountainous areas against possible landslides and flash flood due rains ranging from heavy to intense. In Pampanga, the home province of former president Gloria Macapagal-Arroyo in Central Luzon, officials ordered the pre-emptive evacuation of residents in villages along one of the major river systems.

=== Vietnam ===
Meanwhile, in Vietnam, Typhoon Kai-tak has stormed across the country's north bringing high winds and floods to several areas including the capital Hanoi. Among the victims was a taxi driver who was killed when a tree fell on his car in Hanoi, while two others died from electric shock after a cable fell in northern Son La city. Another victim died in a landslide. Earlier more than 11,000 boats, including several hundred used by tourists at Halong Bay, were ordered to stay close to the shore. The Vietnamese army put 20,000 soldiers backed by helicopters, rescue boats and canoes on standby to handle any incidents.

== See also ==
- Other tropical cyclones named Kai-tak
- Other tropical cyclones named Helen
- Typhoon Hagupit (2008)
- Tropical Storm Jebi (2013)
- Typhoon Kalmaegi (2014)
- Tropical Storm Ma-on (2022)
- Tropical Storm Talim (2023)
- Typhoon Yagi (2024)
