= List of storms named Jolina =

The name Jolina has been used for six tropical cyclones in the Philippine Area of Responsibility by PAGASA in the Western Pacific Ocean. Additionally, it was also used for one European windstorm, which eventually evolved into a Mediterranean tropical-like cyclone (also known as a "medicane").

In the West Pacific:

- Tropical Depression Jolina (2001) – a tropical depression that was only recognized by PAGASA.
- Typhoon Nabi (2005) (T0514, 14W, Jolina) – struck Japan.
- Tropical Storm Goni (2009) (T0907, 08W, Jolina)
- Severe Tropical Storm Jebi (2013) (T1309, 09W, Jolina) – struck the Philippines, China and Vietnam.
- Severe Tropical Storm Pakhar (2017) (T1714, 16W, Jolina) – a strong tropical storm that impacted Southern China.
- Severe Tropical Storm Conson (2021) (T2113, 18W, Jolina) – rapidly intensified into a typhoon in less than 24 hours, according to PAGASA.

The name Jolina was retired following the 2021 Pacific typhoon season and was replaced with Jacinto, which is a masculine given name in Spanish, which was first used during the 2025 season.

In Europe and the Mediterranean:

- Storm Jolina (2026) – a European windstorm which became a Mediterranean tropical-like cyclone while affecting Spain and Libya; also known as Storm Samuel.
