= Typhoon Helen (1972) =

Pacific typhoon in 1972

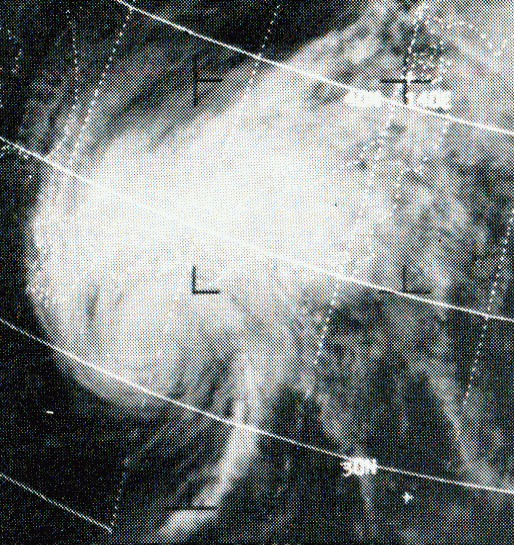
- Typhoon Helen south of Japan on September 16, 1972

Meteorological history
- Formed: September 11, 1972
- Extratropical: September 19
- Dissipated: September 21, 1972

Typhoon
- 10-minute sustained (JMA)
- Lowest pressure: 955 hPa (mbar); 28.20 inHg

Category 3-equivalent typhoon
- 1-minute sustained (SSHWS/JTWC)
- Highest winds: 185 km/h (115 mph)
- Lowest pressure: 957 hPa (mbar); 28.26 inHg

Overall effects
- Fatalities: 87 total
- Damage: $102 million (1972 USD)
- Areas affected: Japan, South Korea
- IBTrACS
- Part of the 1972 Pacific typhoon season

Typhoon Helen known in the Philippines as Typhoon Paring was the most destructive tropical cyclone to strike Japan during the 1972 Pacific typhoon season. Originating from a tropical disturbance on September 11 near the Northern Mariana Islands, Helen gradually intensified as it moved northwestward. By September 14, it reached typhoon strength and soon turned northeast towards Japan. Accelerating due to a trough over the East China Sea, Helen rapidly approached the country and made landfall near Cape Kushimoto as a Category 3-equivalent typhoon on the Saffir–Simpson Hurricane Scale. Later that day, a weakened Helen emerged into the Sea of Japan. After merging with an upper-level low, the storm transitioned into an extratropical cyclone on September 19 and was last noted two days later after moving through southern Hokkaido.

In Japan, Typhoon Helen produced torrential rain, peaking at 790 mm (31 in) in Hokkaido, and damaging winds that caused widespread damage. A total of 4,213 homes were destroyed and another 146,547 were damaged as a result of flash flooding and landslides. Numerous vessels ran aground due to rough seas associated with the storm, including several thousand ton cargo freighters. In all, 87 fatalities and $102 million in damage was attributed to Typhoon Helen.

== Meteorological history ==
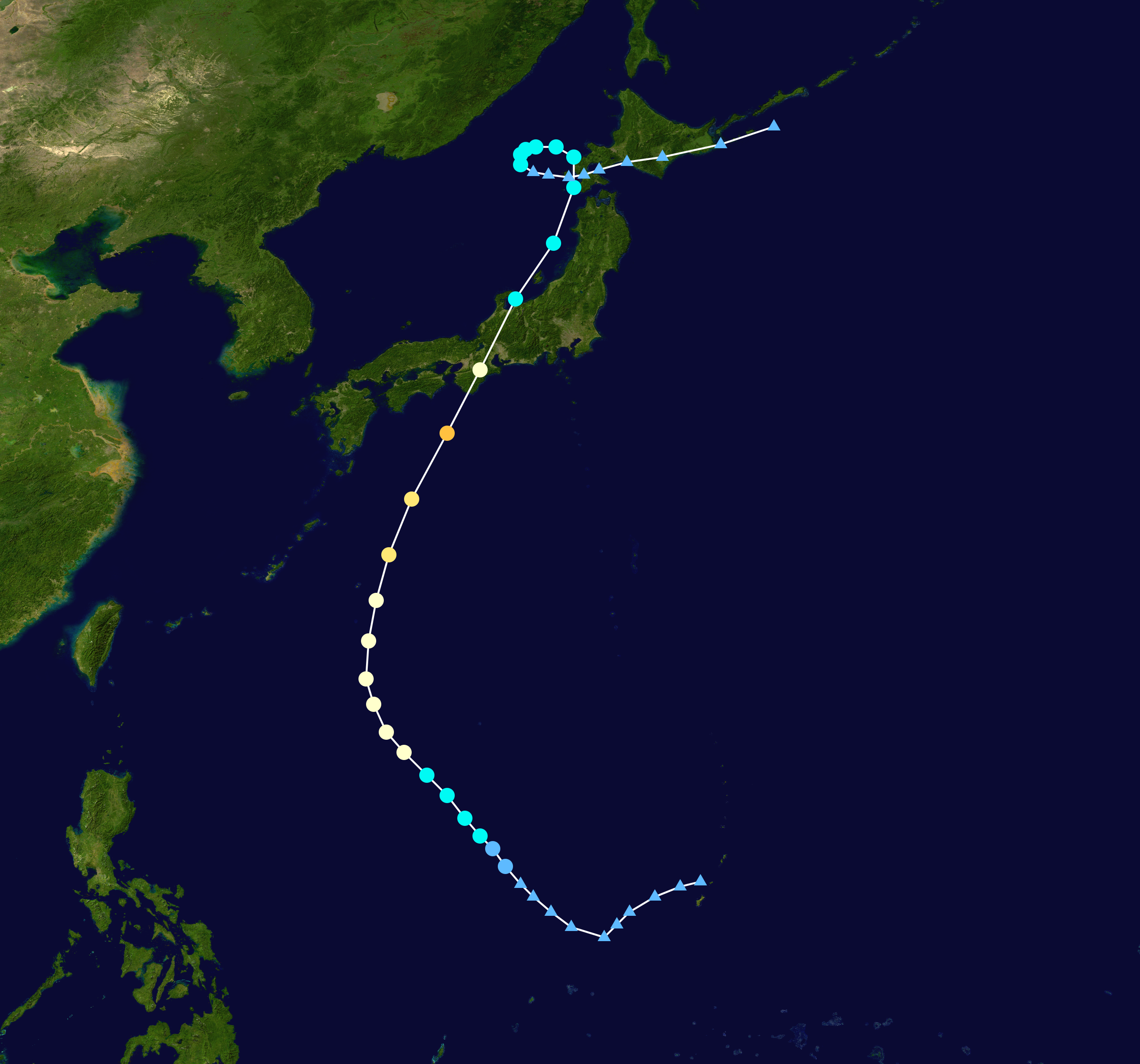
Map plotting the storm's track and intensity, according to the Saffir–Simpson scale Map key Saffir–Simpson scale Tropical depression (≤38 mph, ≤62 km/h) Tropical storm (39–73 mph, 63–118 km/h) Category 1 (74–95 mph, 119–153 km/h) Category 2 (96–110 mph, 154–177 km/h) Category 3 (111–129 mph, 178–208 km/h) Category 4 (130–156 mph, 209–251 km/h) Category 5 (≥157 mph, ≥252 km/h) Unknown Storm type Tropical cyclone Subtropical cyclone Extratropical cyclone, remnant low, tropical disturbance, or monsoon depression

In early September 1972, a tropical disturbance developed within a near-equatorial trough near the Northern Mariana Islands. On September 11, the Japan Meteorological Agency (JMA) began monitoring this system as a tropical depression shortly after moving through the island chain. (Note: The Japan Meteorological Agency is the official Regional Specialized Meteorological Center for the western Pacific Ocean.) Initially, the system tracked southwestward before turning northwestward along the edge of a ridge. On September 13, a United States Air Force reconnaissance plane flew into the system and found that it had intensified into a tropical storm. At this time, the Joint Typhoon Warning Center (JTWC) began monitoring the newly named Tropical Storm Helen. (Note: The Joint Typhoon Warning Center is a joint United States Navy – United States Air Force task force that issues tropical cyclone warnings for the western Pacific Ocean and other regions.) Additionally, the Philippine Atmospheric, Geophysical and Astronomical Services Administration began warning on the system, assigning it the local name Paring. The following day, Helen attained typhoon status as it turned northward. Subsequently, a deepening trough over the East China Sea caused the typhoon to turn north-northeastward and accelerate.

During the afternoon of September 16, a reconnaissance plane recorded flight-level winds of 185 km/h (115 mph). Around this time, surface winds were estimated to be the same, making Helen a Category 3 equivalent on the Saffir–Simpson Hurricane Scale. Later that day, the storm made landfall near Cape Kushimoto. In Shionomisaki Lighthouse, just west of where the center of Helen passed, a barometric pressure of 955 mbar (hPa; 28.26 inHg) was recorded, the lowest in relation to the storm. As the system neared Hokkaido, it slowed down and began a multi-day anticyclonic loop. During this period, it merged with an upper-level low and transitioned into an extratropical cyclone on September 19. The remnants of Helen then tracked across southern Hokkaido before dissipating just east of the island on September 21.

== Impact ==
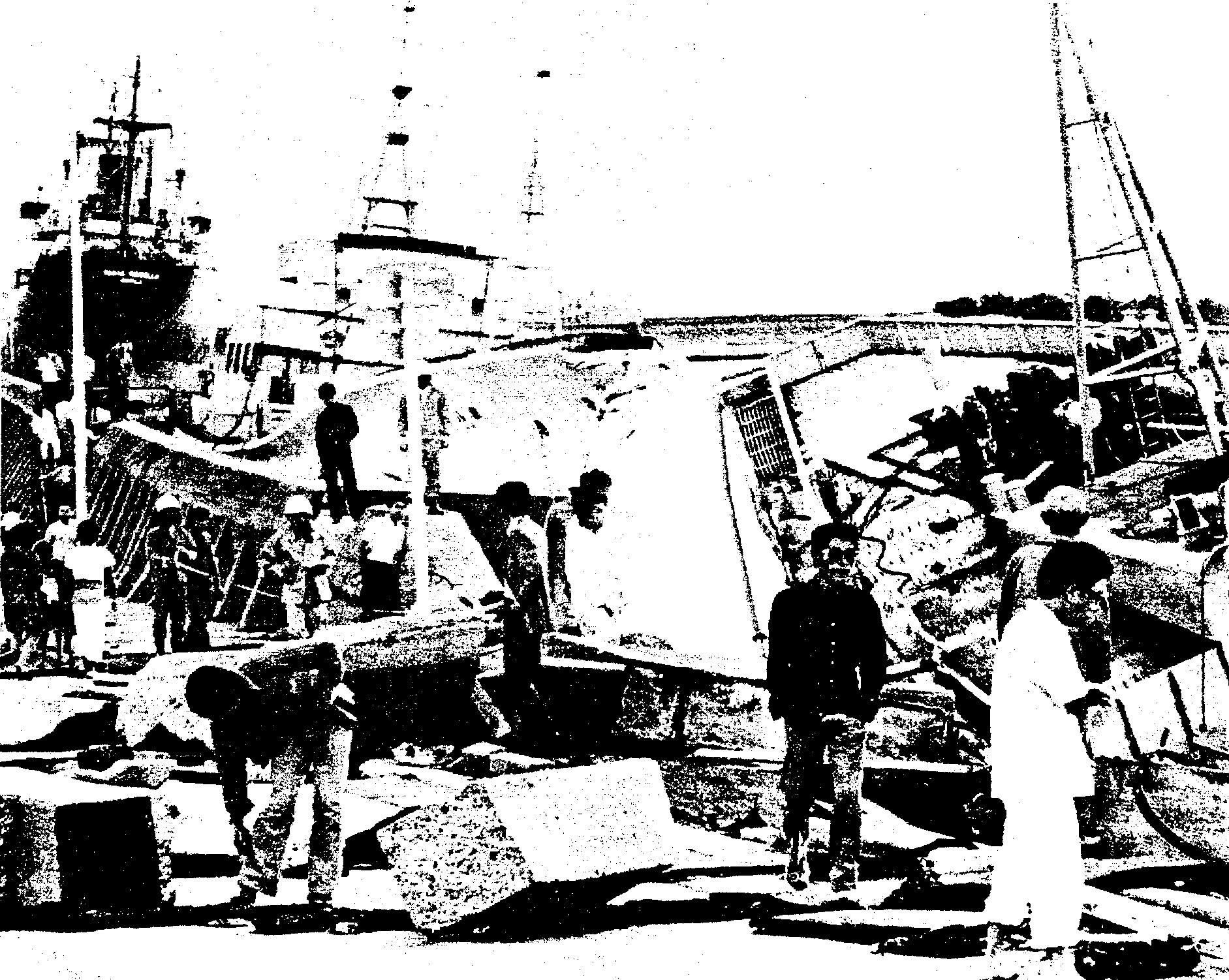
The Maria Rosello was one of the many vessels run aground by Typhoon Helen.

Prior to the typhoon's arrival, officials in Japan warned residents of heavy rains. The Japanese National Railways network suspended service to areas threatened by the storm, stranding numerous people. By September 18, approximately one sixth of the railway service was canceled or delayed.

Throughout the main island of Honshu, areas within 110 km (68 mi) of the storm's center experienced winds in excess of 120 km/h (75 mph), leading to considerable disruptions to air, sea, and land travel. The highest gust was measured at 181 km/h (112 mph) in Sumoto. These winds caused a citywide power outage in Tsu, Mie and scattered outages in Nagoya. Over a substantial portion of the country, the storm produced torrential rains that triggered deadly flash floods. Peak rainfall in Honshu and Hokkaido reached 580 and 790 mm (23 and 31 in), respectively. In Shikoku, ten people died after a landslide destroyed nine homes in Kōchi City. Across Japan, a total of 4,213 homes were destroyed and another 146,547 were damaged, leaving at least 3,000 people homeless. Roads and bridges sustained extensive damage, with large stretches being washed out. According to police in Tokyo, 140 bridges sustained damage. In Higashimatsuyama, a tornado spawned by Helen destroyed eight homes.

Large swells from the storm caused large vessels to wash ashore, including a 9,000 ton freighter in Ise Bay. Twenty-four fishermen drowned off the coast of Hachijō-jima after two vessels sank. Throughout Japan, 322 ships were either damaged or ran aground due to the storm. Including offshore, Helen killed 85 people in Japan. Along the east coast of South Korea, these swells resulted in two fatalities.

On September 17, the Japanese military was mobilized to assist in relief efforts. In all, 87 fatalities, 158 injuries and $102 million in damage was attributed to Typhoon Helen, making it the most destructive tropical cyclone to strike Japan in 1972.

== See also ==
- Other storms of the same name
- 1972 Pacific typhoon season
