= Tropical Storm Chanthu (2004) =

Pacific severe tropical storm in 2004

Severe Tropical Storm Chanthu (Gener)
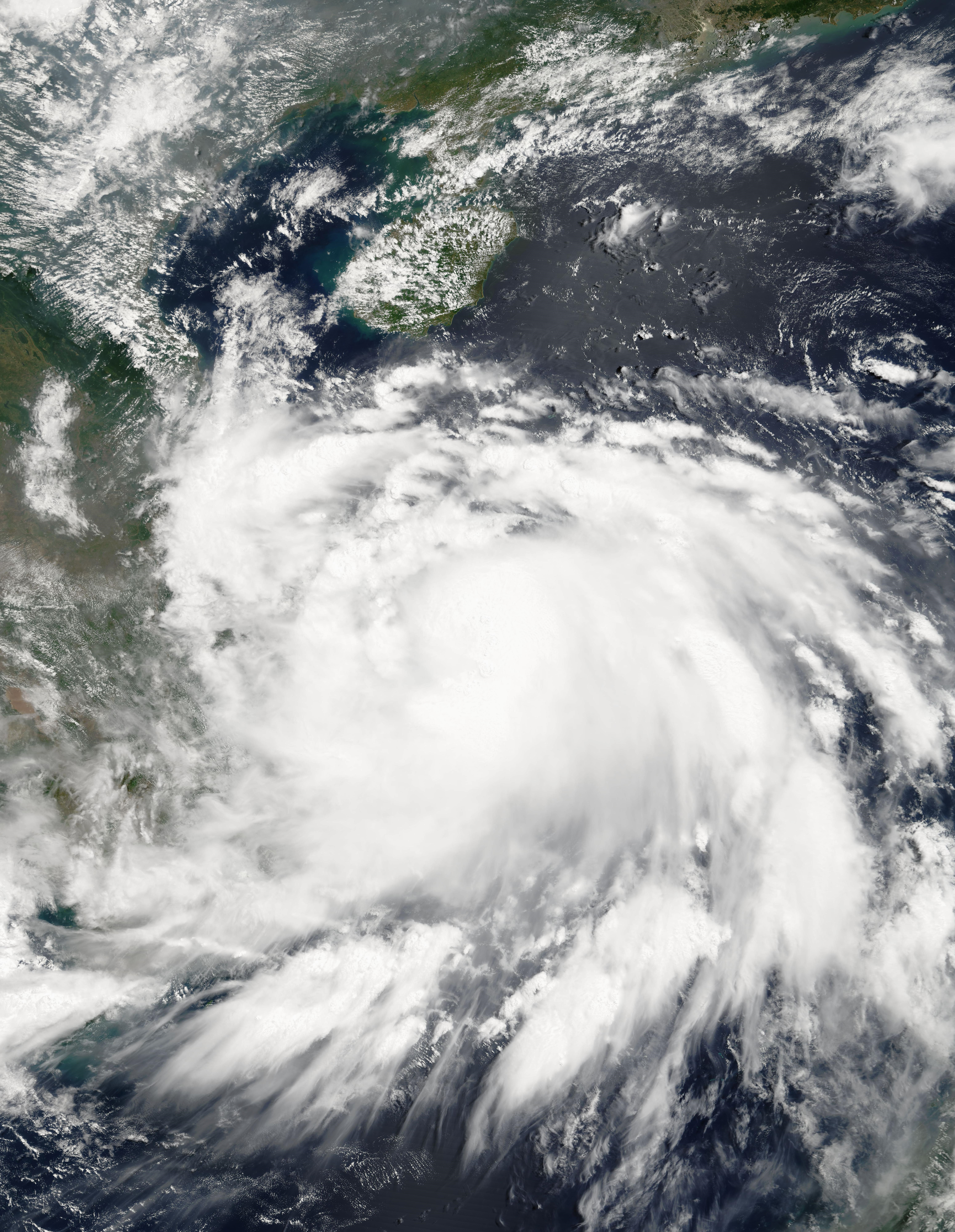
- Tropical Storm Chanthu near peak intensity on June 12

Meteorological history
- Formed: June 7, 2004
- Dissipated: June 15, 2004

Severe tropical storm
- 10-minute sustained (JMA)
- Highest winds: 110 km/h (70 mph)
- Lowest pressure: 975 hPa (mbar); 28.79 inHg

Category 1-equivalent typhoon
- 1-minute sustained (SSHWS/JTWC)
- Highest winds: 140 km/h (85 mph)
- Lowest pressure: 967 hPa (mbar); 28.56 inHg

Overall effects
- Fatalities: 38
- Damage: $7.9 million (2004 USD)
- Areas affected: Philippines, Vietnam, Laos, Cambodia, Thailand
- IBTrACS
- Part of the 2004 Pacific typhoon season

Severe Tropical Storm Chanthu, known in the Philippines as Tropical Storm Gener, was a strong tropical storm that produced deadly flooding in Vietnam in mid-June 2004. Originating from an area of low pressure on June 5, 2004, Chanthu was first declared a tropical depression near southern Leyte Island in the Philippines. Tracking west-northwestward, the depression intensified into a tropical storm over the central Philippines before entering the South China Sea. Once over the warm waters of the sea, the system quickly intensified, attaining its peak 10-minute winds of 110 km/h (70 mph) and 1-minute winds of 140 km/h (85 mph). On June 12, the storm made landfall in Vietnam before quickly weakening over land. By June 13, the system had weakened to a tropical depression and dissipated two days later. In Vietnam, Chanthu wrought substantial damage and killed 12 people while rendering 26 missing. Damage from the storm was estimated at 125 billion Vietnamese dong (US$7.9 million), mostly from agricultural losses.

== Meteorological history ==
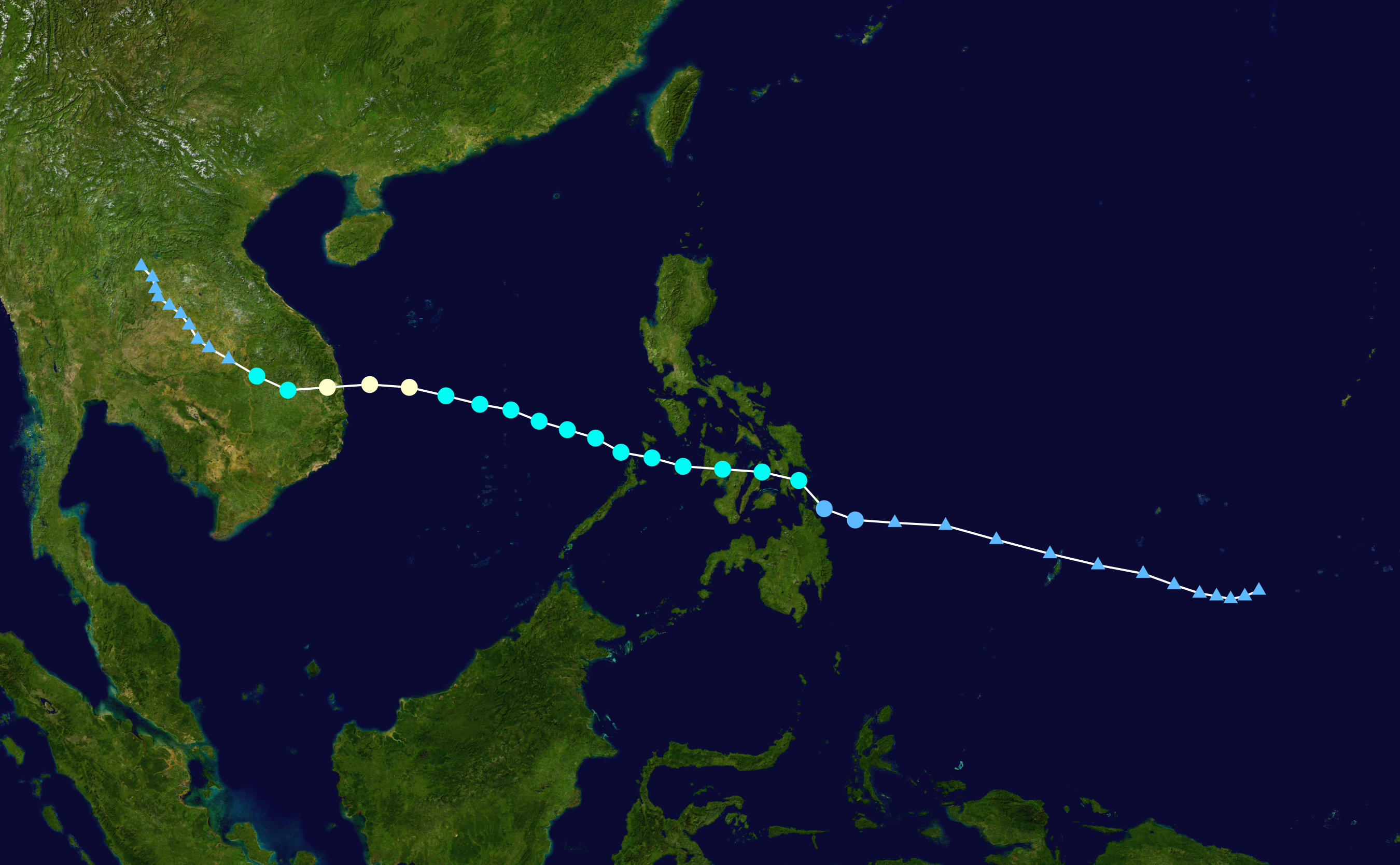
Map plotting the storm's track and intensity, according to the Saffir–Simpson scale Map key Saffir–Simpson scale Tropical depression (≤38 mph, ≤62 km/h) Tropical storm (39–73 mph, 63–118 km/h) Category 1 (74–95 mph, 119–153 km/h) Category 2 (96–110 mph, 154–177 km/h) Category 3 (111–129 mph, 178–208 km/h) Category 4 (130–156 mph, 209–251 km/h) Category 5 (≥157 mph, ≥252 km/h) Unknown Storm type Tropical cyclone Subtropical cyclone Extratropical cyclone, remnant low, tropical disturbance, or monsoon depression

Severe Tropical Storm Chanthu originated from a weak area of low pressure associated with disorganized deep convective activity located about 480 kilometers (300 mi) east-southeast of Yap, the Federated States of Micronesia on June 5, 2004. Low wind shear and weak diffluence allowed the system to gradually become organized; however, the following day, the Joint Typhoon Warning Center (JTWC) ceased monitoring the system for potential development. By June 7, convection redeveloped around the low, and the JTWC resumed monitoring it. Later that day, the Japan Meteorological Agency (JMA) classified it as a tropical depression. The same day, the depression entered the Philippine Area of Responsibility (PAR) of the Philippine Atmospheric, Geophysical and Astronomical Services Administration and was given the local name Gener.

On June 8, the JTWC issued a Tropical Cyclone Formation Alert for the system. At 00:00 UTC on June 9, the JTWC designated the depression as Tropical Storm 08W while located about 795 km (495 mi) southeast of Manila, Philippines. Several hours later, the storm made landfall on southern Leyte Island with winds of 55 km/h (35 mph 10-minute winds) according to the JMA and 75 km/h (45 mph 1-minute winds) according to the JTWC. Shortly after, the system also made landfall in northern Cebu. At 12:00 UTC that same day, the storm made landfall in Panay. The next day, the system finally made landfall in Linapacan before resurfacing in the South China Sea, rapidly tracking towards the west-northwest in response to a subtropical ridge to the north.

At 18:00 UTC on June 10, the JMA upgraded the system to a tropical storm, at which time it received the name Chanthu. (Note: The name Chanthu (Khmer: ច័ន្ធូ, [can.ˈtʰuː]) was contributed by Cambodia and means tuberose (Polianthes tuberosa) in Khmer.) As Chanthu neared Vietnam, it tracked over warm sea surface temperatures in the South China Sea, allowing the storm to quickly intensify. Outflow from the storm decreased on June 11. During a 12-hour span on June 11 and 12, the central barometric pressure of Chanthu dropped 15 hPa (mbar), falling to 975 hPa (mbar). The system continued moving west-northwest in a faster pace. The maximum sustained winds also rose at this time; the JMA assessed the storm to have peaked with winds of 110 km/h (70 mph 10-minute winds) as a severe tropical storm on June 12; however, the JTWC assessed Chanthu to have peaked as a Category 1 typhoon on the Saffir–Simpson hurricane scale with winds of 140 km/h (85 mph 1-minute winds). Chanthu made landfall around 12:00 UTC on June 12 near Qui Nhơn, Vietnam, at this intensity. Due to the interaction with land, the storm rapidly weakened, with the JMA downgrading the system into a tropical storm that same day. The JMA eventually classified the system as a tropical depression early on July 13. The remnants of the storm persisted over Cambodia until June 15, at which time it dissipated; by that time, the circulation was barely discernible.

== Impact and aftermath ==
In Vietnam, Chanthu dropped up to 238.9 mm (9.41 in) of rain, triggering flooding that killed 12 people and left 26 missing. Twenty of them were fishermen who were killed due to their boat sinking. Seven deaths and five injuries were recorded in Bình Định province, and four deaths were recorded in Quảng Ngãi province. At least 180 homes were completely destroyed, and numerous others were damaged. Tens of thousands of hectares of agricultural land were inundated by the storm. Damage from the storm was estimated at 125 billion VND (US$7.9 million). In Bình Định, a report on June 13 stated that 21 houses collapsed, 160 houses had damaged roofs, and 50,000 cubic metres (1,800,000 cubic feet) of water filled the canals. Hundreds of hectares of shrimp ponds were also eroded in the province. In Quảng Nam province, according to a report the same day, 82 houses were damaged, 5,000 hectares (12,000 acres) of summer-autumn rice and 1,500 ha (3,700 acres) of vegetable plots were eroded. The entrance to the storm-shelter boat dock at the Chàm Islands was destroyed. The storm caused 70 percent of the shows in an international art festival in Huế to be cancelled. Two tankers were washed ashore by the waves, while 12 Indonesian sailors were brought to safety during the storm. Three fishermen were rescued due to strong waves. In Huế, more than 50 percent of summer-autumn rice crops were flooded.

As a tropical storm, Chanthu passed through the Philippines, producing moderate rainfall across several islands. The highest total was recorded at Roxas, where 150.2 mm (5.91 in) of rain fell. In Thailand, the remnants of Chanthu, along with a low-pressure trough and a southwest monsoon, produced widespread rainfall between June 13 and 16. Daily rainfall totals peaked at 216.7 mm (8.53 in) in Nan, Thailand. Storm totals are not known but likely surpassed 400 mm (16 in).

Following the storm, the Government of Vietnam allocated 36 billion Vietnamese đồng (US$2 million) in recovery funds. Twenty of the fatalities were from one ship that went missing during the storm; on June 24, search attempts were called off. The families of the fishermen were each given 10 million VND (US$560) in cash and gifts by National Assembly Deputy Chairman Truong Quang Duoc.

== See also ==
- Other tropical cyclones named Chanthu
- Other tropical cyclones named Gener
- Tropical Storm Sarah (1983)
- Typhoon Chan-hom (2009)
