= List of storms named Frank =

The name Frank has been used for 14 tropical cyclones worldwide.

In the East Pacific Ocean:

- Tropical Storm Frank (1980) – weak storm that stayed over open ocean, never affecting land
- Hurricane Frank (1986) – category 1 hurricane that stayed out to sea
- Hurricane Frank (1992) – category 4 hurricane that stayed out to sea
- Tropical Storm Frank (1998) – weak storm, grazed the Baja California Peninsula as a tropical depression.
- Hurricane Frank (2004) – category 1 hurricane that stayed out to sea
- Hurricane Frank (2010) – category 1 hurricane, skirted the coast of western Mexico, causing 6 deaths
- Hurricane Frank (2016) – category 1 hurricane that affected Mexico, despite staying out to sea
- Hurricane Frank (2022) – category 1 hurricane that stayed out to sea

In the Philippine Area of Responsibility by PAGASA in the West Pacific Ocean:

- Typhoon Conson (2004) (T0404, 07W, Frank) – made landfall as a minimal tropical storm in the Kōchi Prefecture, Japan
- Typhoon Fengshen (2008) (T0806, 07W, Frank) – made a direct hit on the Philippines and on China, causing severe damage and resulted in at least 1,371 deaths

The name Frank was retired following the 2008 Pacific typhoon season and was replaced with Ferdie.

In the Australian region:

- Cyclone Frank (1984)
- Cyclone Frank (1995)

In the South Pacific Ocean:

- Cyclone Frank (1999)

In the South-West Indian Ocean:

- Cyclone Frank (2004)
