= List of storms named Helen =

The name Helen or Hellen has been used for twenty tropical cyclones worldwide: sixteen in the Western Pacific Ocean (six regionally in the Philippine Area of Responsibility by PAGASA), one in the North Indian Ocean, one in the South-West Indian Ocean, and two in the Australian region.

== Western Pacific ==
- Typhoon Helen (1945)
- Typhoon Helen (1954) (T5406)
- Typhoon Helen (1958) (T5821) – struck Japan.
- Typhoon Helen (1961) (T6110, 31W)
- Typhoon Helen (1964) (T6411, 14W)
- Tropical Storm Helen (1966) (T6624, 26W) – struck Japan.
- Typhoon Helen (1969) (T6914, 18W)
- Typhoon Helen (1972) (T7220, 20W, Paring) – struck Japan.
- Tropical Storm Helen (1975) (T7518, 21W)
- Tropical Storm Helen (1992) (T9208, 08W)
- Typhoon Helen (1995) (T9505, 08W, Karing) – struck southern China.

=== Storms named by PAGASA ===
- Typhoon Dianmu (2004) (T0406, 09W, Helen) – an intense typhoon that traversed southeastern part of Japan.
- Typhoon Kalmaegi (2008) (T0807, 08W, Helen) – a moderate typhoon that struck the tip of Taiwan
- Typhoon Kai-tak (2012) (T1213, 14W, Helen) – made landfall in the Philippines and China.
- Typhoon Megi (2016) (T1617, 20W, Helen) – made landfall in Taiwan as a Category 4 typhoon.
- Severe Tropical Storm Higos (2020) (T2007, 08W, Helen) – affected the Philippines and China.
- Tropical Storm Pulasan (2024) (T2414, 15W, Helen) – a strong tropical storm that affected East China, Japan, South Korea and the Philippines.

Preceded by Gener	Pacific typhoon season names Helen	Succeeded by Igme

== Indian Ocean ==
- Cyclone Helen (2013) – affected Andhra Pradesh and Tamil Nadu, India
- Cyclone Hellen (2014) – one of the most powerful tropical cyclones in the Mozambique Channel on record.

== Australian Region ==
- Cyclone Helen (1974)
- Cyclone Helen (2007)
