= Tropical Storm Jebi (2013) =

Pacific severe tropical storm in 2013

Severe Tropical Storm Jebi (Jolina)
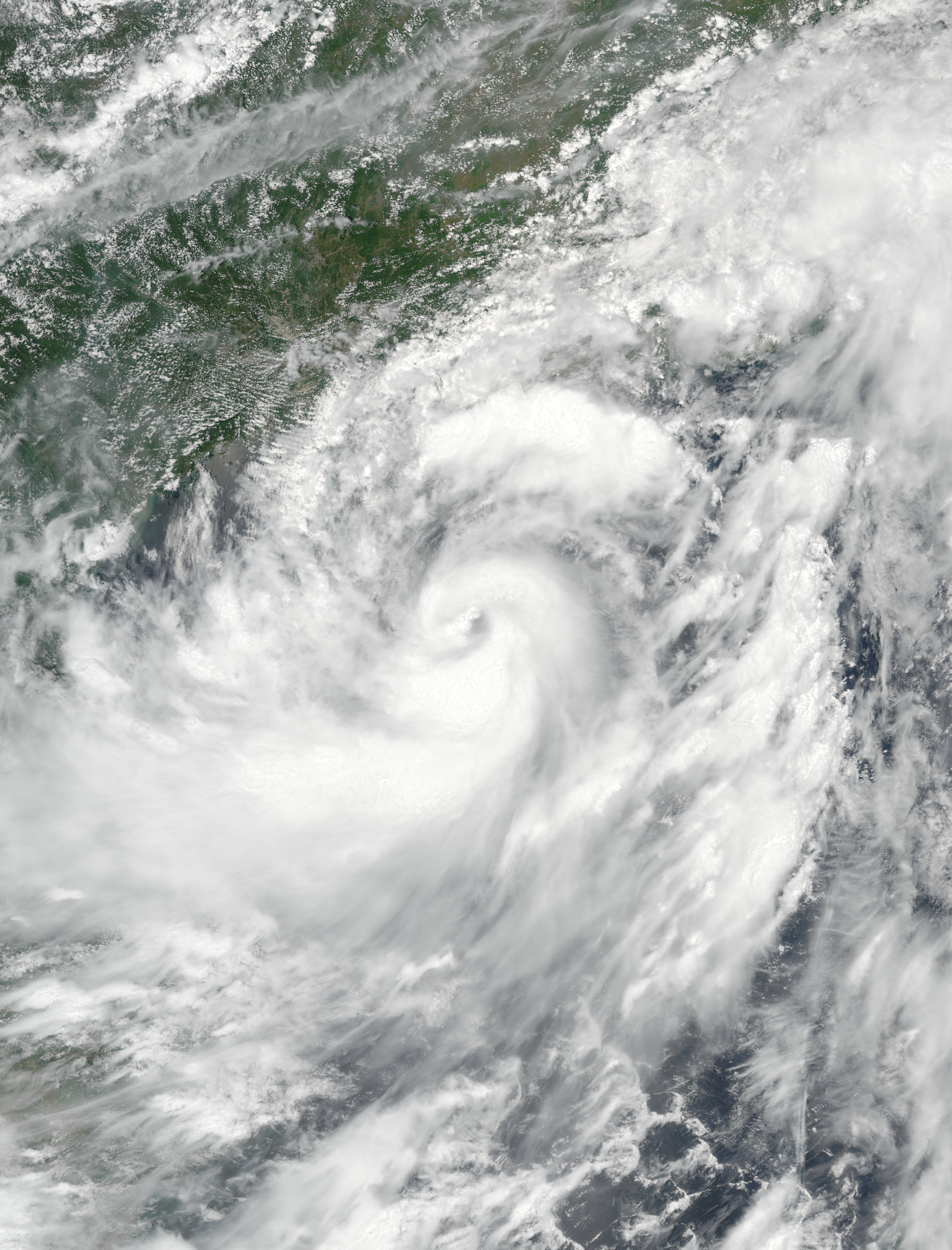
- Severe Tropical Storm Jebi near peak intensity on August 2

Meteorological history
- Formed: July 28, 2013
- Dissipated: August 3, 2013

Severe tropical storm
- 10-minute sustained (JMA)
- Highest winds: 95 km/h (60 mph)
- Lowest pressure: 985 hPa (mbar); 29.09 inHg

Tropical storm
- 1-minute sustained (SSHWS/JTWC)
- Highest winds: 110 km/h (70 mph)
- Lowest pressure: 978 hPa (mbar); 28.88 inHg

Overall effects
- Fatalities: 7 total
- Damage: $83.2 million (2013 USD)
- Areas affected: Philippines; China; Vietnam; Laos; Thailand
- IBTrACS
- Part of the 2013 Pacific typhoon season

Severe Tropical Storm Jebi, (Note: The name Jebi (Korean: 제비, [ˈt͡ɕe̞(ː)bi]) was contributed by South Korea and refers to the barn swallow (Hirundo rustica) in Korean.) known in the Philippines as Tropical Storm Jolina, was a tropical cyclone that caused loss of life and moderate damage across Vietnam and South China in late July 2013. At least six people were killed in Vietnam. The most extensive losses took place in Quảng Ninh Province where 320 homes and 200 hectares of crops were damaged. In China, losses were listed at CNY 490 million (US$80.3 million).

== Meteorological history ==
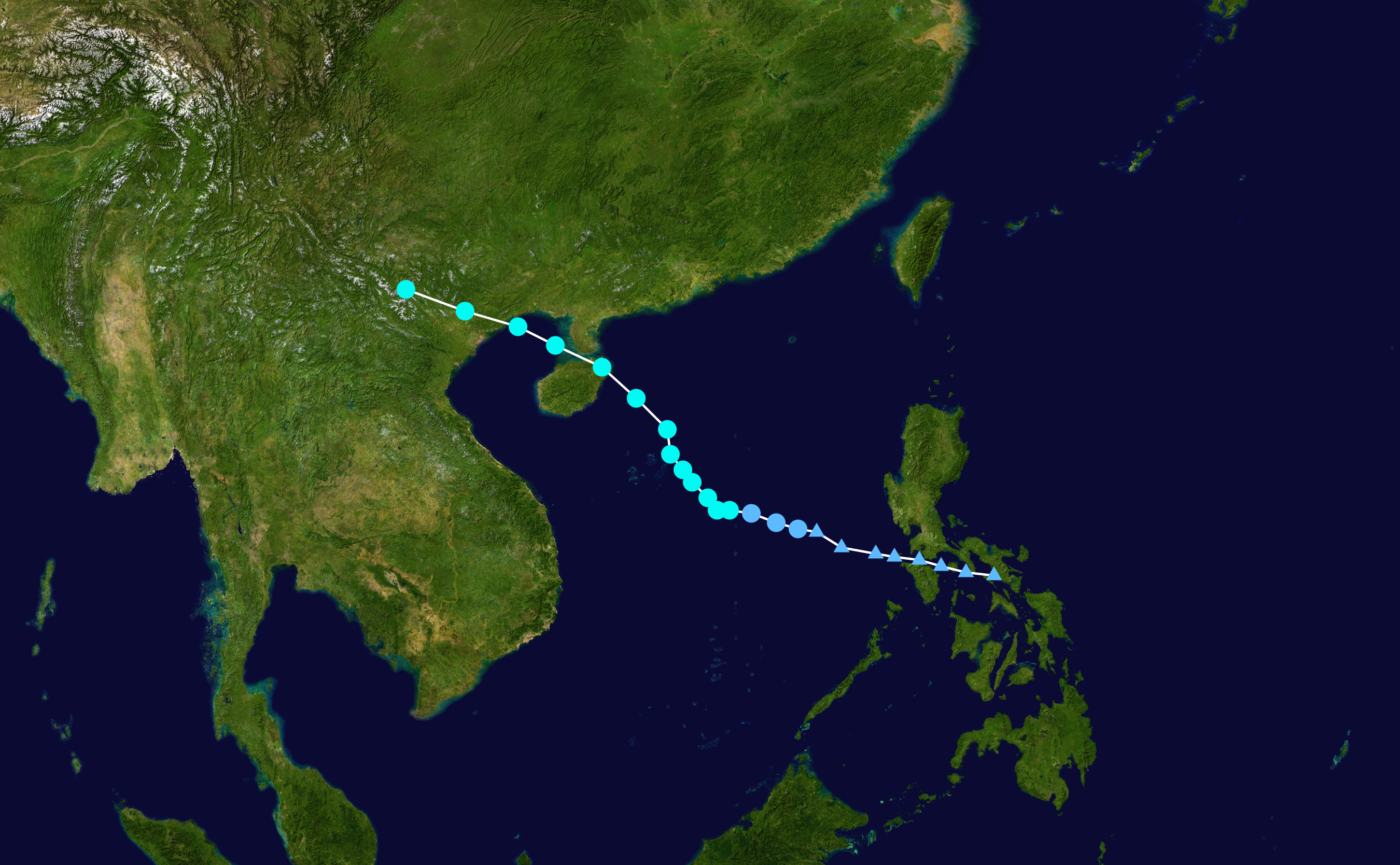
Map plotting the storm's track and intensity, according to the Saffir–Simpson scale Map key Saffir–Simpson scale Tropical depression (≤38 mph, ≤62 km/h) Tropical storm (39–73 mph, 63–118 km/h) Category 1 (74–95 mph, 119–153 km/h) Category 2 (96–110 mph, 154–177 km/h) Category 3 (111–129 mph, 178–208 km/h) Category 4 (130–156 mph, 209–251 km/h) Category 5 (≥157 mph, ≥252 km/h) Unknown Storm type Tropical cyclone Subtropical cyclone Extratropical cyclone, remnant low, tropical disturbance, or monsoon depression

On July 26, a low pressure area was observed 600 km (375 mi) east of General Santos and was embedded along the intertropical convergence zone that brought heavy rains to Mindanao. During the next three days, the low pressure area crossed the Philippines and arrived on the South China Sea on July 30, located west of Batangas.

After favorable conditions, both PAGASA and JMA upgraded the system into a tropical depression and was named Jolina. On July 31, the JMA upgraded the system into a tropical storm and was given the international name Jebi. On August 1, Jebi continued to intensify, and reached severe tropical storm on August 2.

On August 3, Jebi weakened into tropical storm, and the JMA and JTWC downgraded Jebi into tropical depression and made landfall over Northern Vietnam, before it dissipated later that day.

== Impact ==
=== Philippines ===
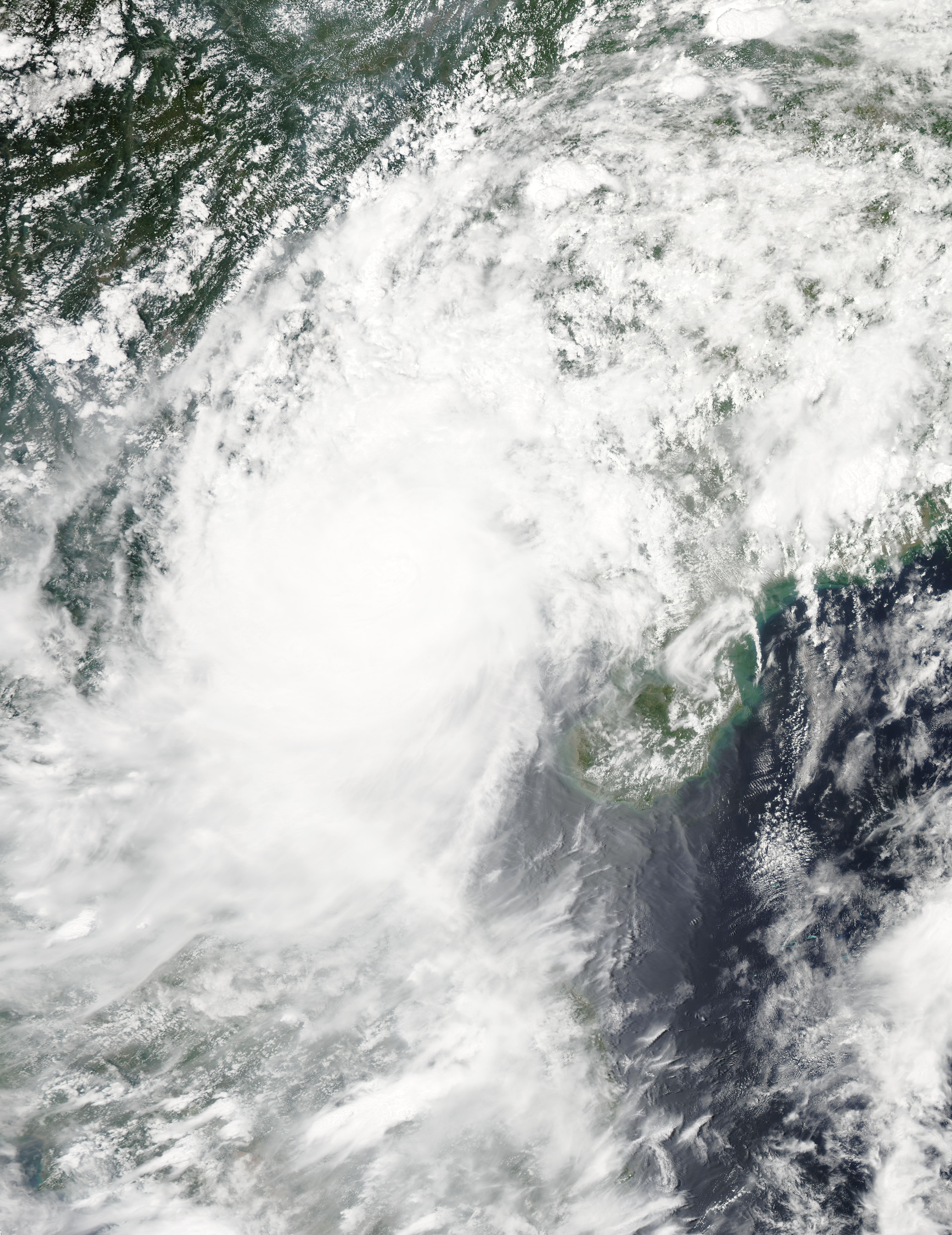
Tropical Storm Jebi over Vietnam on August 3

Before Jebi developed, the system impacted roughly 30,000 people in Cotabato City, Maguindanao, North Cotabato, and Sultan Kudarat. 25 of the 37 villages in Cotabato City were submerged.

=== China ===
Approximately 1,000 homes were damaged and economic losses were listed at CNY490 million (US$79.9 million).

=== Vietnam ===
Jebi made landfall in Quang Ninh on August 3 morning at 03.00 UTC. In Vietnam, more than 1,000 homes and other structures were damaged in multiple northern provinces. At least seven people were killed and 11 others were injured. Total economic losses were estimated at VND75.89 billion (US$3.3 million).

Located at the edge of the storm, Hanoi has had little rain last night. To 10 rain to cover the entire province (concentration about 30 minutes). The moment happened flooding rain in some locations, such as: Pham Van Dong (areas without sewer system), down 5 Phung Hung - Duong Thanh, Doi, Lieu Giai, Huynh Thuc Khang, Nguyen Promotion receded ... and after 15 minutes.

== See also ==
- Other tropical cyclones named Jebi
- Other tropical cyclones named Jolina
- Typhoon Kai-tak (2012)
- Typhoon Kalmaegi (2014)
