= List of storms named Igme =

The name Igme has been used for six tropical cyclones in the Philippine Area of Responsibility by PAGASA in the Western Pacific Ocean.

- Typhoon Mindulle (2004) (T0407, 10W, Igme) – a powerful storm that affected the Philippines, Taiwan and China.
- Typhoon Fung-wong (2008) (T0808, 09W, Igme) – a system that made landfall in Taiwan as a Category 2.
- Typhoon Tembin (2012) (T1214, 15W, Igme) – interacted with nearby Typhoon Bolaven, causing it to make a U-turn and head for South Korea.
- Typhoon Chaba (2016) (T1618, 21W, Igme) – a powerful super typhoon that struck South Korea in October 2016.
- Typhoon Bavi (2020) (T2008, 09W, Igme) – a system that formed in the Philippine Sea and passed South Korea but made landfall on North Korea.
- Tropical Depression Igme (2024) (17W, Igme) – a tropical depression that made landfall in Eastern China.

Preceded by Helen	Pacific typhoon season names Igme	Succeeded by Josefa
