= Typhoon Kalmaegi (2008) =

Pacific typhoon in 2008

Typhoon Kalmaegi (Helen)
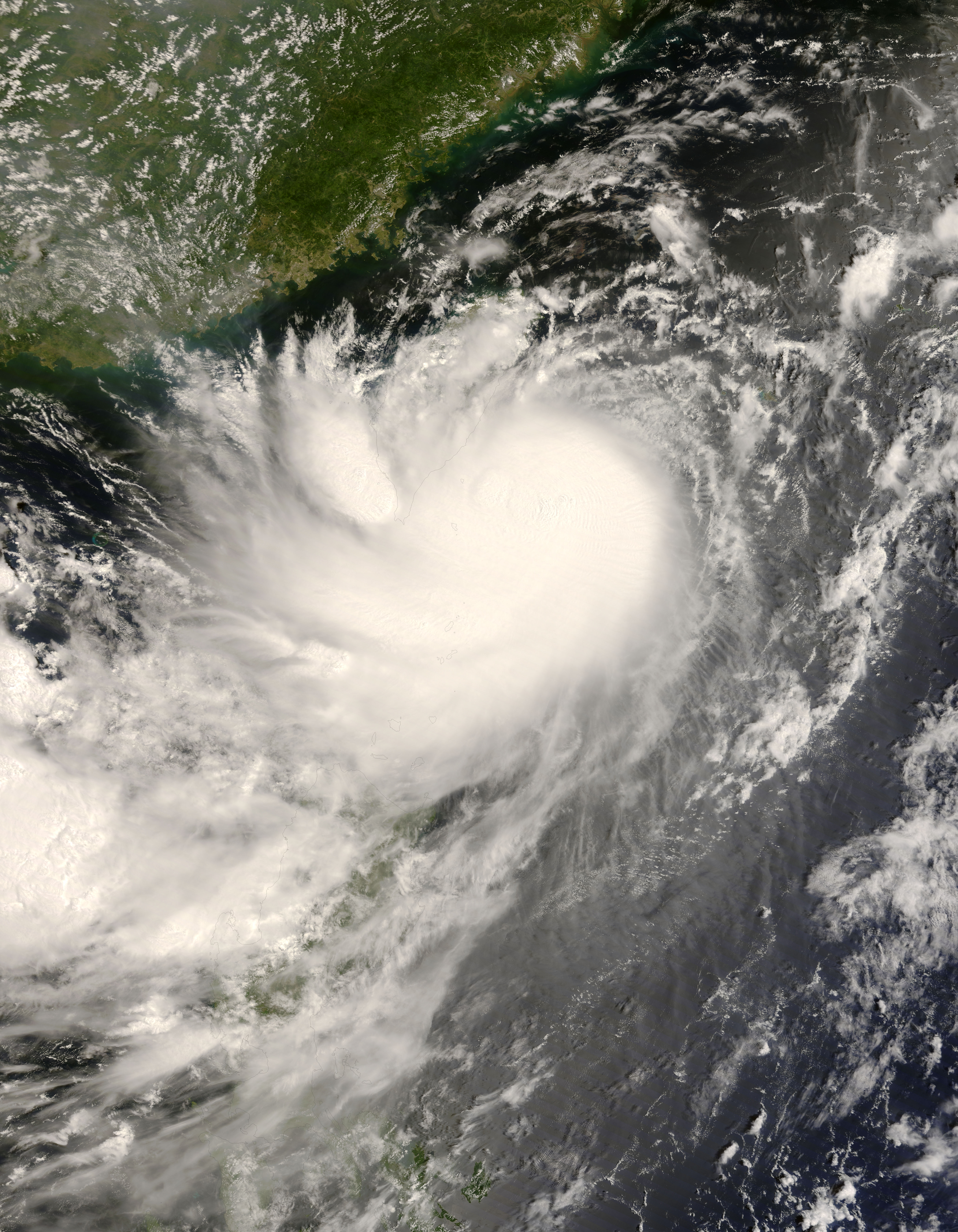
- Kalmaegi shortly before being upgraded to a typhoon on July 17

Meteorological history
- Formed: July 13, 2008
- Extratropical: July 20, 2008
- Dissipated: July 24, 2008

Typhoon
- 10-minute sustained (JMA)
- Highest winds: 120 km/h (75 mph)
- Lowest pressure: 970 hPa (mbar); 28.64 inHg

Category 2-equivalent typhoon
- 1-minute sustained (SSHWS/JTWC)
- Highest winds: 165 km/h (105 mph)
- Lowest pressure: 956 hPa (mbar); 28.23 inHg

Overall effects
- Fatalities: 25
- Damage: $332 million (2008 USD)
- Areas affected: Philippines, Taiwan, China, Republic of Korea, and Japan
- IBTrACS
- Part of the 2008 Pacific typhoon season

Typhoon Kalmaegi, (Note: The name Kalmaegi (Korean: 갈매기, [ka̠ɭmɛɡi]) was contributed by North Korea and means seagull in Korean.) known in the Philippines as Typhoon Helen, was the seventh named storm and the fifth typhoon that was recognised by the Japan Meteorological Agency. The Joint Typhoon Warning Center also recognised it as the eighth tropical depression, the seventh tropical storm and the sixth typhoon of the 2008 Pacific typhoon season.

Kalmaegi (Helen) formed as a tropical depression on 13 July when it was located to the east of the Philippines. It was named Kalmaegi by RSMC Tokyo on 15 July; the storm reached its peak winds of 75 knots (139 km/h) on 17 July. Shortly afterwards it made a direct landfall on Taiwan and then moved into China's Fujan province the next day it emerged into the Taiwan Strait and raced towards North Korea where it became fully extratropical and the last advisories were released.

== Meteorological history ==
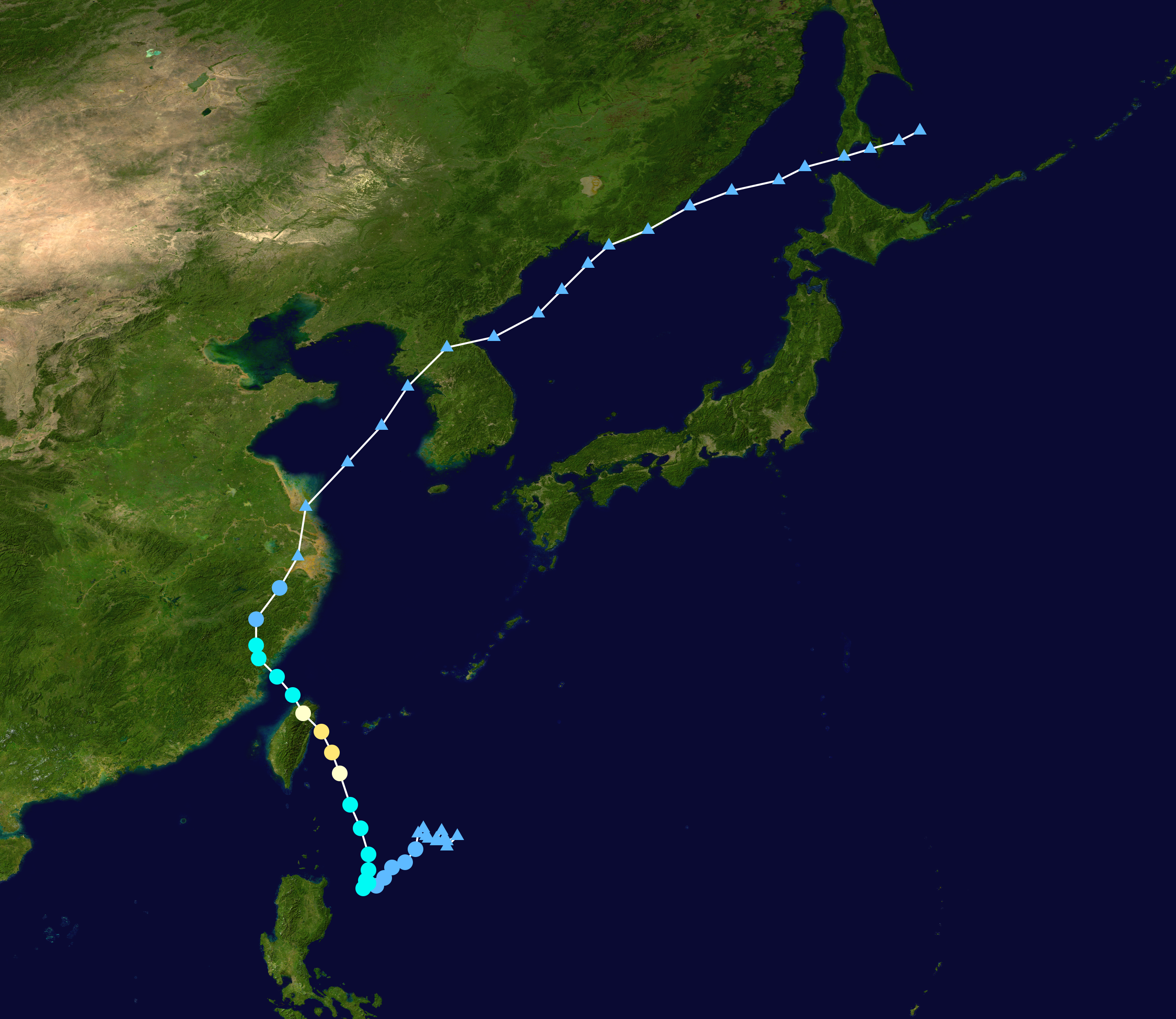
Map plotting the storm's track and intensity, according to the Saffir–Simpson scale Map key Saffir–Simpson scale Tropical depression (≤38 mph, ≤62 km/h) Tropical storm (39–73 mph, 63–118 km/h) Category 1 (74–95 mph, 119–153 km/h) Category 2 (96–110 mph, 154–177 km/h) Category 3 (111–129 mph, 178–208 km/h) Category 4 (130–156 mph, 209–251 km/h) Category 5 (≥157 mph, ≥252 km/h) Unknown Storm type Tropical cyclone Subtropical cyclone Extratropical cyclone, remnant low, tropical disturbance, or monsoon depression

Early on July 13, the Japan Meteorological Agency (JMA), began to issue full advisories on a tropical depression, which was located to the east of the Philippines. Later that day PAGASA allocated the name Helen to the depression, followed the next day by the Joint Typhoon Warning Center (JTWC) designating the number 08W. Early on July 15, both the JTWC, and the JMA upgraded the depression to tropical storm status, with RSMC Tokyo assigning the name Kalmaegi. Early on the 17th, Kalmaegi began rapidly intensifying; JMA was the first agency to upgrade it into a typhoon. JTWC followed a few hours later. Finally, PAGASA upgraded Kalmaegi (Helen) into a typhoon on later that day.

Typhoon Kalmaegi, which was downgraded to tropical storm status by Taiwan's Central Weather Bureau while still east of the country, made landfall at Ilan County in northeast Taiwan in the evening of July 17 at 19:40 local time (13:40 UTC) and emerged into the Taiwan Strait at 7:20 in the morning local time (01:20 UTC) on July 18. From Taiwan, the typhoon, now downgraded to a tropical storm, turned toward southeast China. In Xiapu County of Fujian Province, the tropical storm made landfall at 17:50 local time (0950 UTC), with winds of about 90 miles per hour. Early on July 19, the JTWC issued its final advisory on Kalmaegi and downgraded it to a tropical depression. However, the JMA continued to issue advisories and maintained Kalmaegi as a tropical storm as it moved to the Yellow Sea. Late the next day, the JMA downgraded Kalmaegi to a low (extratropical cyclone) as it moved inland over North Korea.

== Preparations ==
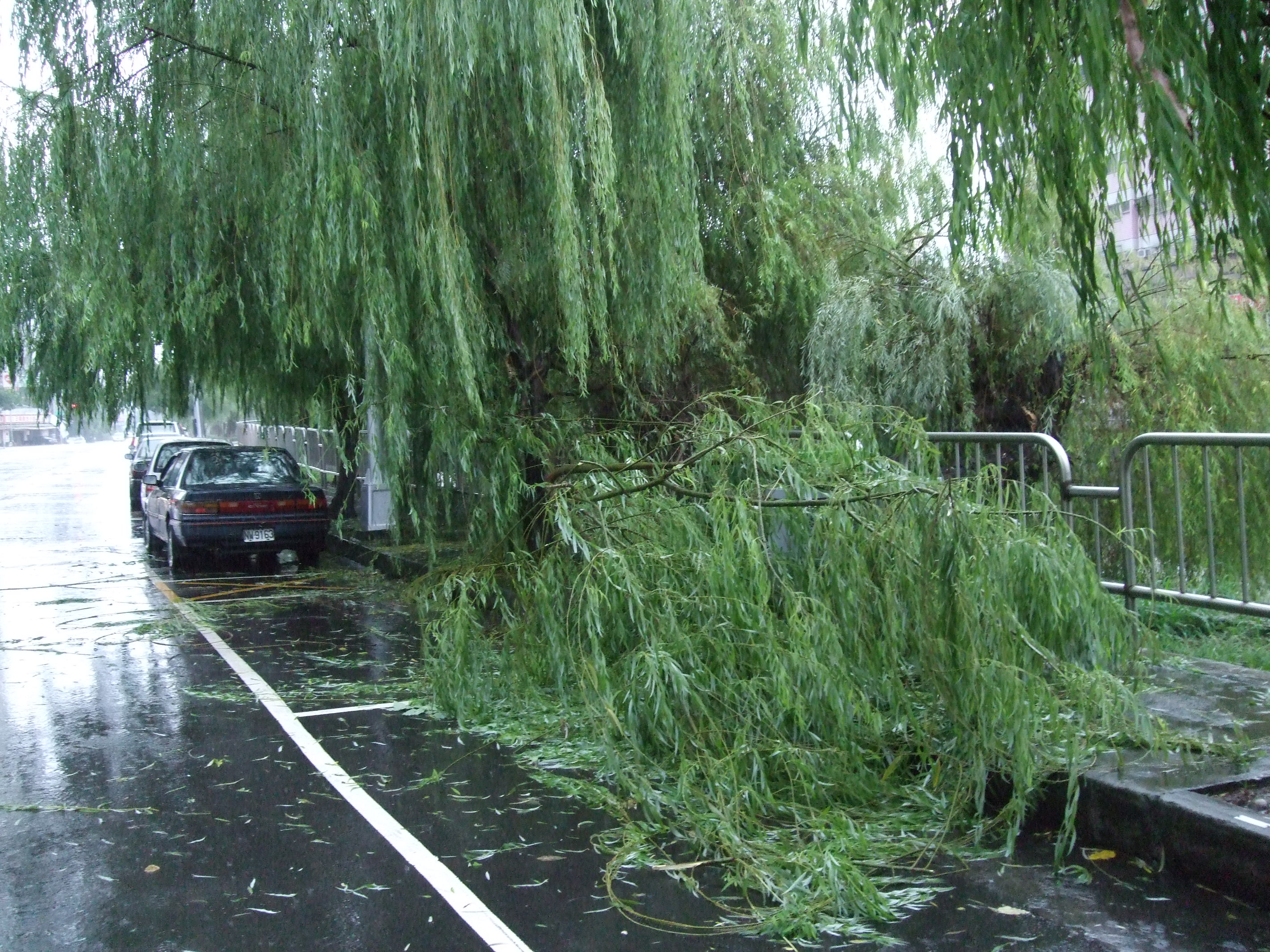
Fallen tree in downtown Taichung City from Typhoon Kalmaegi.

=== Philippines ===
PAGASA issued Public Storm Warning Signals for provinces across Northern Luzon from July 14 till the 17th. Initially, PAGASA issued Storm Signal Number 1 over Cagayan, Isabela, Batanes Group of Islands and Calayan Group of Islands. But as the storm tracked nearer to Northern Luzon, more and more are issued Signals 1, 2 and 3. By the afternoon of the 16th Philippine Time, only Batanes was left under Signal Number one. PAGASA issued their last advisory on Helen (Kalmaegi) on 2100 UTC 17 July (5 a.m. 18 July PST).

=== Taiwan ===
Several flights in and out of Taiwan were either delayed or cancelled due to the typhoon. All evening classes for the day the storm made landfall were closed however, all classes were scheduled to resume the next day.

=== Mainland China ===
Officials in Fujian Province and Zhejiang Province ordered about 61,000 ships to return to port and evacuated an estimated 360,000 people from low-lying areas.

== Impact ==
=== Philippines ===
In the Philippines, it passed over Northern Luzon (mostly affecting Ilocos and Cagayan Valley), where it killed two people and injured another. The first fatality occurred after a man drove off the edge of a cliff due to poor visibility. The second was linked to a snake bite following the storm. In all, Kalmaegi (Helen) affected at least 31,129 people throughout 146 barangays in three provinces. Property damages amounted to ₱ 5.6 million. The storm also hit 82 villages (all in Northern Luzon) and caused around ₱1.3 million worth of damage to agriculture. Meanwhile, the storm intensified the southwest monsoon, thus causing torrential rains over the rest of Luzon. The resulting rains thus caused suspension of classes in parts of Metro Manila.

=== Taiwan ===
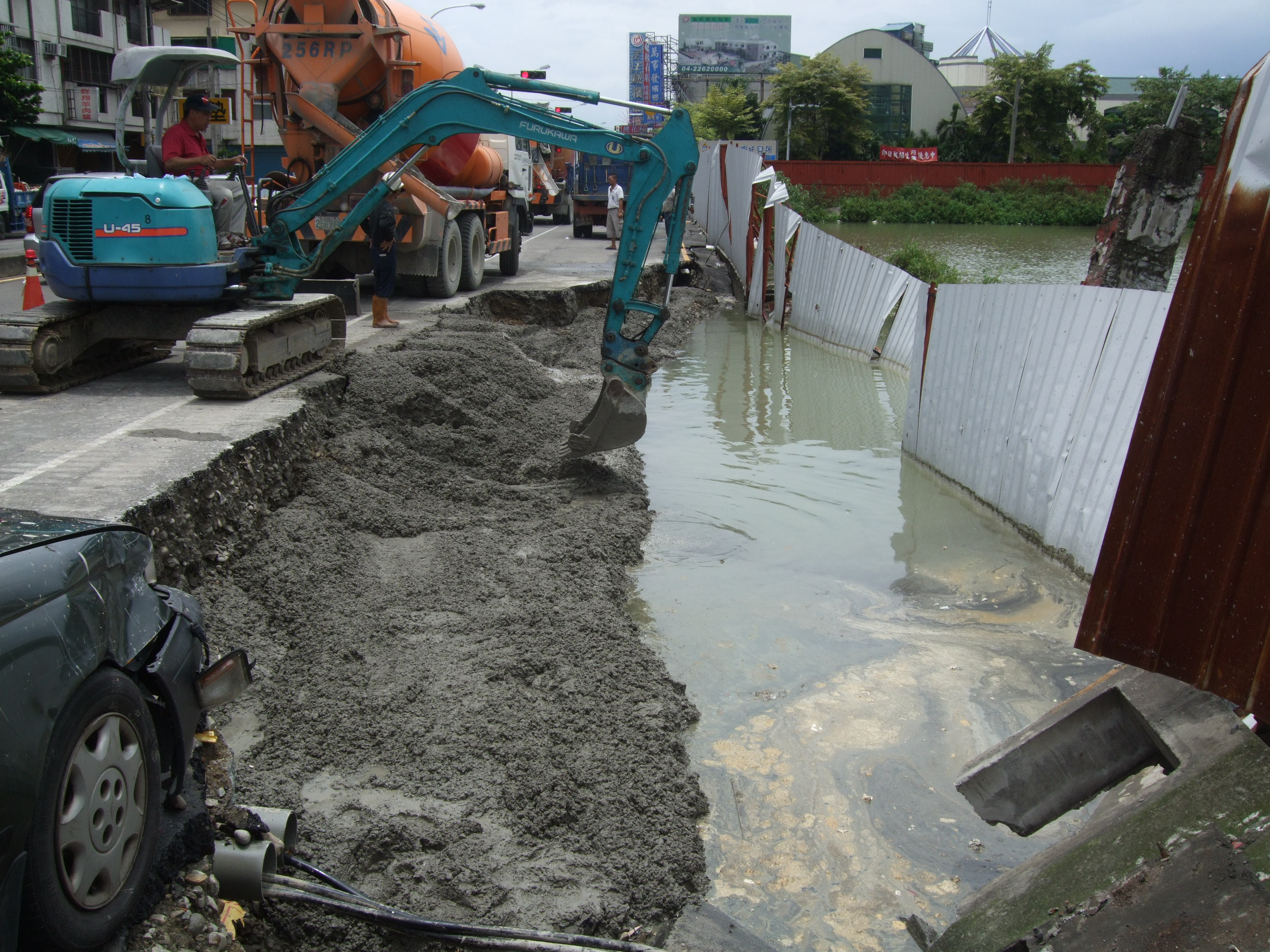
Repair crews fixing damage to Wuquan South Road in downtown Taichung the day after Typhoon Kalmaegi passed through.

At least 19 lost their lives due to the storm and six were reported as missing. Tainan County (now part of Tainan City) in southern Taiwan reported more than 1,100 millimetres (43 in) of rainfall in some mountain regions. An estimated 600 millimetres (24 in) of rain fell within seven hours, causing several drainage systems to overflow. Local media reported that an estimate 115,000 people in Taiwan, primarily in Tainan, Nantou County, and Taichung County (now part of Taichung City) lost power during the storm. The storm caused NT$ 300 million (US$15.1 million) worth of damage, and destroyed about 5,100 hectares of orchards and crops. Agricultural losses amounted to $300 million (USD).

=== Mainland China ===
In Xiapu County of Fujian Province and in neighboring Zhejiang Province, 360,000 residents left coastal and low-lying homes to escape the storm. Schools and many businesses remained closed, and the storm was expected to travel northwest.

=== Republic of Korea ===
The remnants of Kalmaegi produced heavy rains over the Korean Peninsula, peaking at 237.5 millimetres (9.35 in) in Seoul. Rainfall rates were recorded up to 52.5 millimetres (2.07 in) per hour at times, caused water to overflow at several of the major dams along the Han, Nakdong, and Geum Rivers. One dam, the Paldang-Dam had to discharge water at a rate of 4,817 m^{3} (170,100 ft^{3}) per second. Eight levees were breached, with a total length of 105 m (344 ft), due to rising rivers, flooding 93 homes and 87.58 hectares (216.4 acres) of farmland. Rains also caused landslide which covered an area of 0.6 hectares (1.5 acres) and washed out a small bridge. Four people were killed, another was listed as missing, and a total of 271 were affected by the storm.

=== Japan ===
Yonaguni, lying at the end of the Ryukyu Islands near Taiwan, experienced strong winds gusting up to 98 kilometres per hour (61 mph).

=== Russia ===
After moving through the Sea of Japan, the remnants of Kalmaegi brought significant rainfall and strong winds to parts of eastern Russia. Winds were reported to be gusting up to 85 kilometres per hour (53 mph) in Primorsky Krai and southern Khabarovsk Krai. Several rivers in Primorsky were reportedly near flood stage as the storm passed through. Offshore, Several ships were stranded during the storm and sent out distress signals.

== Aftermath ==
=== Philippines ===
Relief goods, worth ₱138,744 were sent to affected areas within region one.

=== Taiwan ===
Government officials in Taiwan enacted a large rescue operation involving over 60,000 civilian and government rescue workers. Following the severe flooding in Taiwan, officials in mainland China were willing to send fresh vegetables whenever needed.

== See also ==
- Other tropical cyclones named Kalmaegi
- Other tropical cyclones named Helen
- Typhoon Chan-hom (2015)
- Typhoon Fitow
- Typhoon Sepat
- Typhoon Saola (2012)
- Typhoon Nesat (2017)
