= Typhoon Kalmaegi (2014) =

Pacific typhoon in 2014

Typhoon Kalmaegi (Luis)
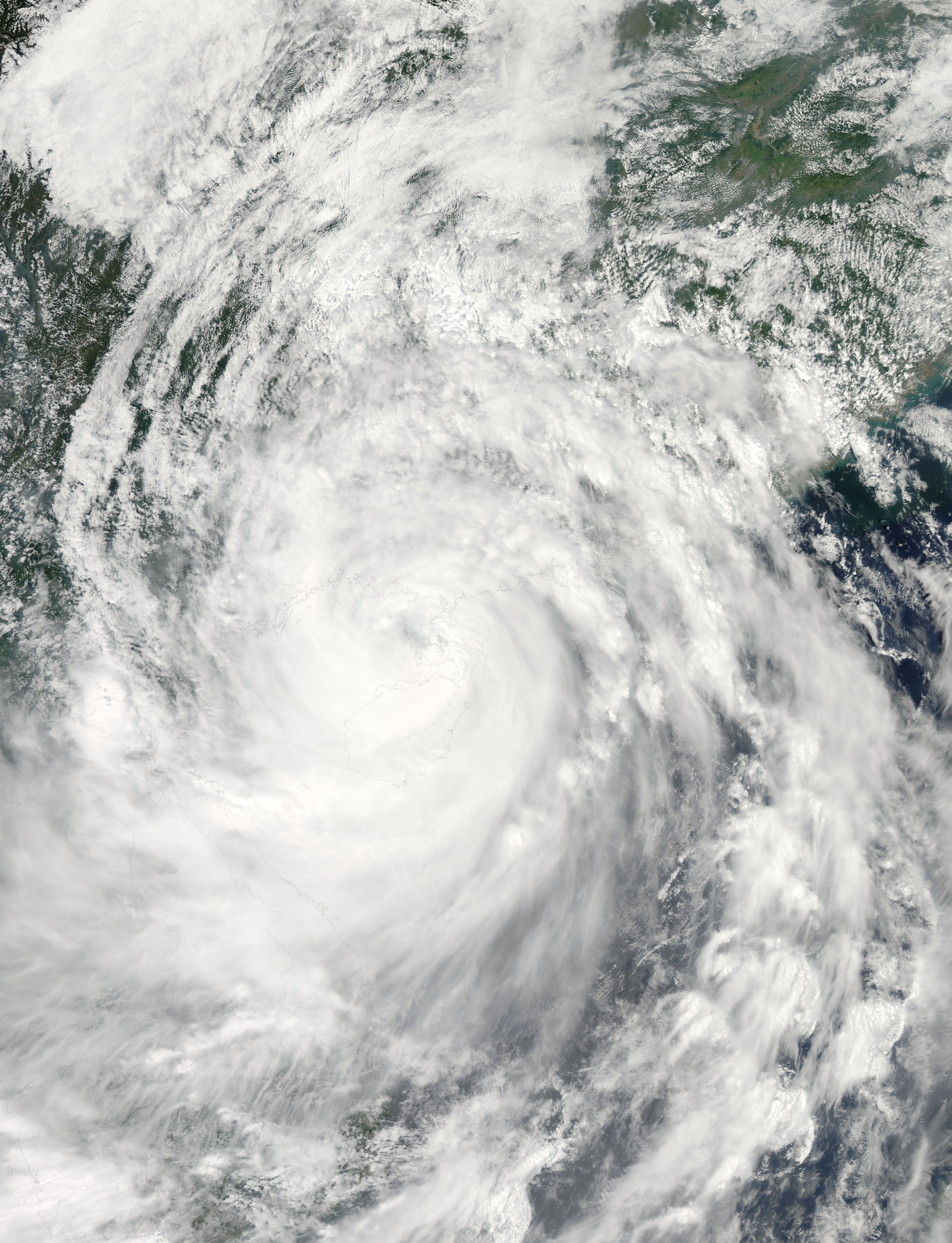
- Kalmaegi at peak intensity over Hainan on September 16

Meteorological history
- Formed: September 11, 2014
- Dissipated: September 18, 2014

Typhoon
- 10-minute sustained (JMA)
- Highest winds: 140 km/h (85 mph)
- Lowest pressure: 960 hPa (mbar); 28.35 inHg

Category 1-equivalent typhoon
- 1-minute sustained (SSHWS/JTWC)
- Highest winds: 150 km/h (90 mph)
- Lowest pressure: 963 hPa (mbar); 28.44 inHg

Overall effects
- Fatalities: 48
- Damage: $2.94 billion (2014 USD)
- Areas affected: Caroline Islands, Philippines, China, Vietnam, India, Taiwan
- IBTrACS
- Part of the 2014 Pacific typhoon season

Typhoon Kalmaegi, (Note: The name Kalmaegi (Korean: 갈매기, [ka̠ɭmɛɡi]) was contributed by North Korea and means seagull in Korean.) known in the Philippines as Typhoon Luis, was the 22nd depression and the 15th named storm of the 2014 typhoon season. Kalmaegi was the first storm to make landfall over the Philippines since Typhoon Rammasun, two months prior. The storm caused flooding in Southeast Asia during mid-September. Kalmaegi started as a disturbance near Palau that could become a tropical cyclone in the next few days. JTWC would designate it to Tropical Depression 15W. PAGASA also named the system Luis as the 11th named storm inside PAR. Environmental conditions became more conducive for intensification, which allowed 15W to intensify into a tropical storm and attained the name Kalmaegi. On September 13, the storm intensified into a Category-1 typhoon as it moved through open warm waters. Around 17:00 PHT (09:00 UTC) on September 14, the eye of Kalmaegi made landfall in the coastal town of Divilacan, Isabela, bringing gusty winds and heavy rains in the area.

Shortly after landfall, Kalmaegi was downgraded to a severe tropical storm while JTWC maintained a Category-1 typhoon. On September 15, Kalmaegi left the responsibility as it headed for Southern China where it intensified back to a typhoon. Kalmaegi made landfall in Hainan Island as a high-end Category-1 typhoon. Kalmaegi rapidly weakened to a large tropical storm as it continued to move in a westward direction. Both agencies classified Kalmaegi as a tropical depression and dissipated on September 18.

== Meteorological history ==
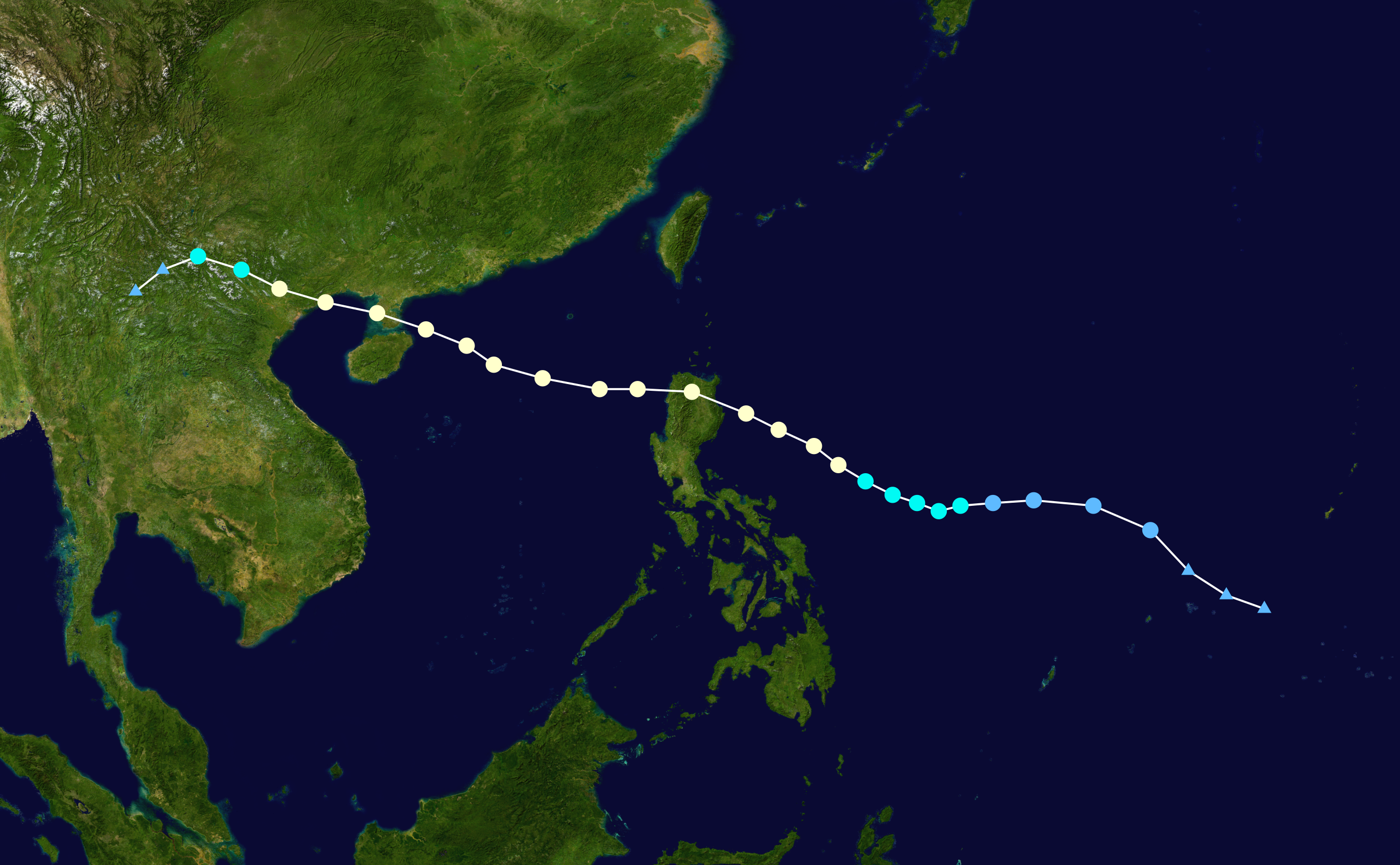
Map plotting the storm's track and intensity, according to the Saffir–Simpson scale Map key Saffir–Simpson scale Tropical depression (≤38 mph, ≤62 km/h) Tropical storm (39–73 mph, 63–118 km/h) Category 1 (74–95 mph, 119–153 km/h) Category 2 (96–110 mph, 154–177 km/h) Category 3 (111–129 mph, 178–208 km/h) Category 4 (130–156 mph, 209–251 km/h) Category 5 (≥157 mph, ≥252 km/h) Unknown Storm type Tropical cyclone Subtropical cyclone Extratropical cyclone, remnant low, tropical disturbance, or monsoon depression

On September 10, a tropical disturbance formed northeast of Palau with a possibility of becoming a tropical cyclone in the next few days. Later the same day, the JTWC had reported that it had intensified into a tropical depression, giving it the designation "15W". Early on September 12, the JMA started to track 15W as a tropical depression. In the same time, PAGASA had issued their first advisories on the storm, naming it as Tropical Depression Luis. As Luis entered a more conducive environment, it steadily intensified into a tropical storm and was named Kalmaegi by the JMA later that day and the JTWC followed suit on the same day. (Note: The name Kalmaegi (Korean: 갈매기, [ka̠ɭmɛɡi]) was contributed by North Korea and means seagull in Korean.) The storm entered an area of warm waters as the JMA upgraded it to a typhoon, while JTWC upgraded it to a category 1 typhoon late on September 13. Kalmaegi made landfall over Cagayan early the next day, as it start to interact with land and weakened to a tropical storm. On September 15, Kalmaegi entered the South China Sea and intensified again. The typhoon reached its peak strength while making its second landfall over Hainan Island. Kalmaegi rapidly weakened to a large tropical storm as it continued to move in a westward direction. Both agencies classified Kalmaegi as a tropical depression. Later that day, both agencies announced that Kalmaegi had dissipated.

== Preparations and impact ==
=== Philippines ===
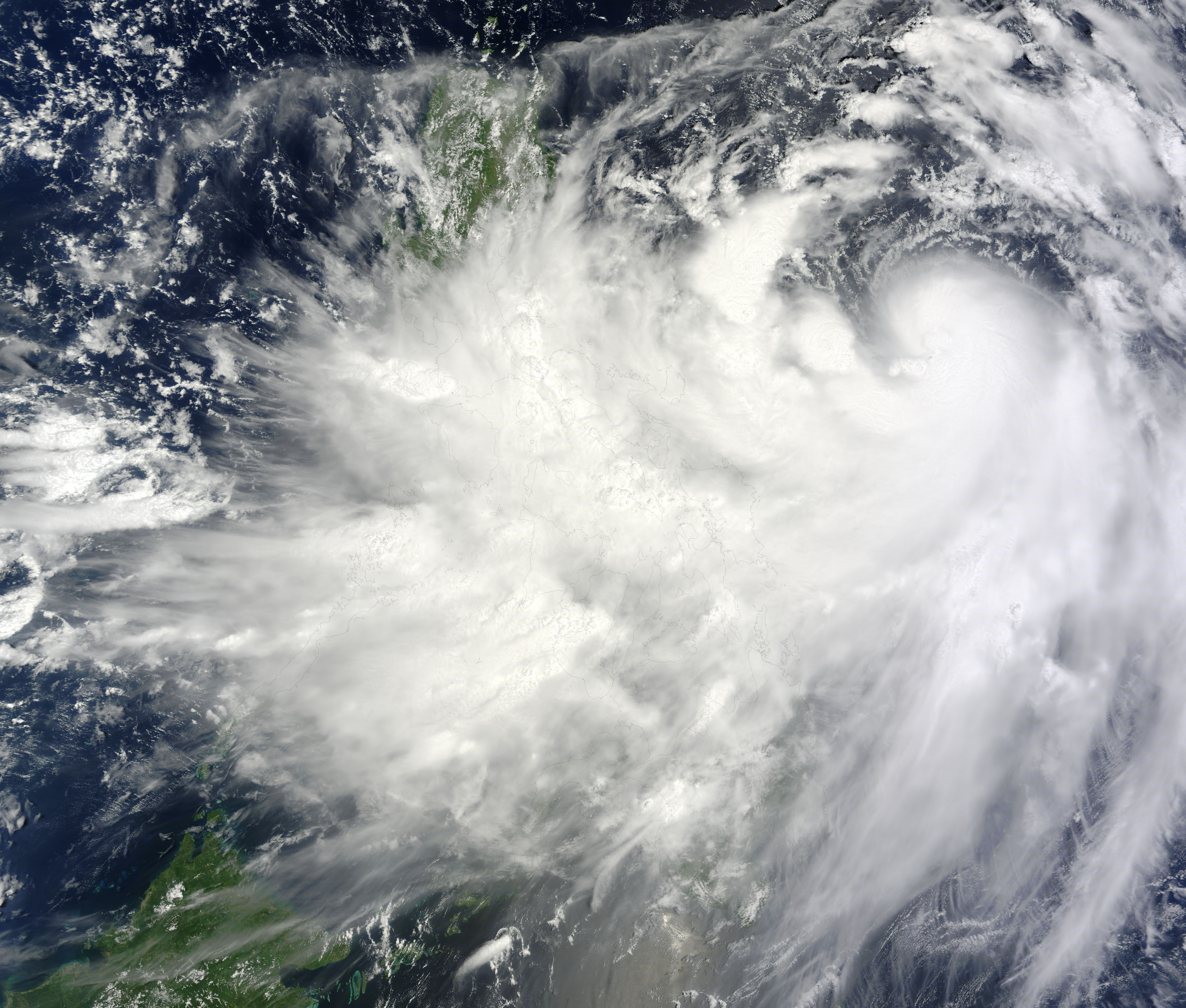
Kalmaegi intensifying over the Philippine Sea on September 13

Known in the Philippines as Luis, PAGASA had issued some first Signal Warnings over Region II on September 13. PAGASA had also warned residents in regions of Luzon about landslides, thunderstorms and flash floods from the effects of Luis. Several rubber boats and medical aid supplies were prepared.

As the storm was exiting the country, PAGASA reported that the province of Pangasinan was under the "state of calamity" due to flash floods, especially towns in Calasiao, Santa Barbara and even as far as Urdaneta. Meanwhile, the NDRRMC said that landslides had occurred in Cagayan Valley as of September 17. It was also reported that at least 200 houses had been destroyed while 600 were damaged.

As for impacts in the Philippines, a total of 12 people were killed by the storm with eight of them drowning as the boat they were on sank due to rogue waves caused by the storm. According to the NDRRMC, damages amounted to ₱1.2 billion (US$27.3 million).

==== Highest Public Storm Warning Signal ====
PSWS#	LUZON	VISAYAS	MINDANAO
PSWS #3	Ilocos Norte, Apayao, Kalinga, Isabela, Mt. Province, Ilocos Sur, Ifugao, Northern Portion of Aurora, Quirino, Abra	NONE	NONE
PSWS #2	Batanes Babuyan Group of Islands, La Union, Benguet, Nueva Vizcaya, Pangasinan, Nueva Ecija, Rest of Aurora	NONE	NONE
PSWS #1	Tarlac, Zambales, Pampanga, Northern Portion of Quezon including Polillo Island	NONE	NONE

=== China ===
On September 15, the government weather bureau reported that the storm was headed toward southern China at about 19 mph. In Haikou, the capital of Hainan Province, schools were ordered to close on September 16 and 17. Later that day, the storm hit Hong Kong, disrupting flights and forcing the stock market to close, as well as causing 29 injuries. The stock market reopened Tuesday morning. The storm hit Hainan on September 16, where more than 90,000 people were evacuated from its east coast prior to the storm's impact. Kalmaegi killed a total of 11 people and caused about CN¥17.74 billion (US$2.89 billion).

=== Vietnam ===
The typhoon was also felt in Vietnam, with strong gusty winds and flash floods reported. As of September 18, it was reported that the death toll had risen to 9 and 10 were injured. Damages has also been topped to VND20 billion (US$944,000). Another 2 were reported killed on the same day. On September 19, it was reported that 15 were injured. So far, a total of 13 people were reported killed by the storm. Total damage in Vietnam reached 535 billion dong (US$25.2 million, 2014 USD).

=== India ===
After the dissipation of Kalmaegi, its remnants continued to move towards Eastern India on September 19. With this, it caused flash floods and landslides over the area until it dissipated on September 23. On September 22, it was reported that a total of 12 people had been killed in Meghalaya in the past 72 hours. Several bridges were also reported destroyed.

== See also ==
- Weather of 2014
- Tropical cyclones in 2014
- Typhoon Ketsana (2009)
- Typhoon Nesat (2011)
- Typhoon Kai-tak (2012)
- Tropical Storm Jebi (2013)
- Typhoon Rammasun (2014)
- Typhoon Haima (2016)
- Typhoon Mangkhut (2018)
- Tropical Storm Ma-on (2022)
- Typhoon Yagi (2024)
