= Neoguri =

- Hangul: 너구리
- RR: neoguri
- MR: nŏguri
- IPA: [nʌɡuɾi]

Neoguri is the Korean word for the common raccoon dog. It may also refer to:

- List of storms named Neoguri
- Neoguri (instant noodle)
