= Typhoon Neoguri (2008) =

Pacific typhoon in 2008

Typhoon Neoguri (Ambo)
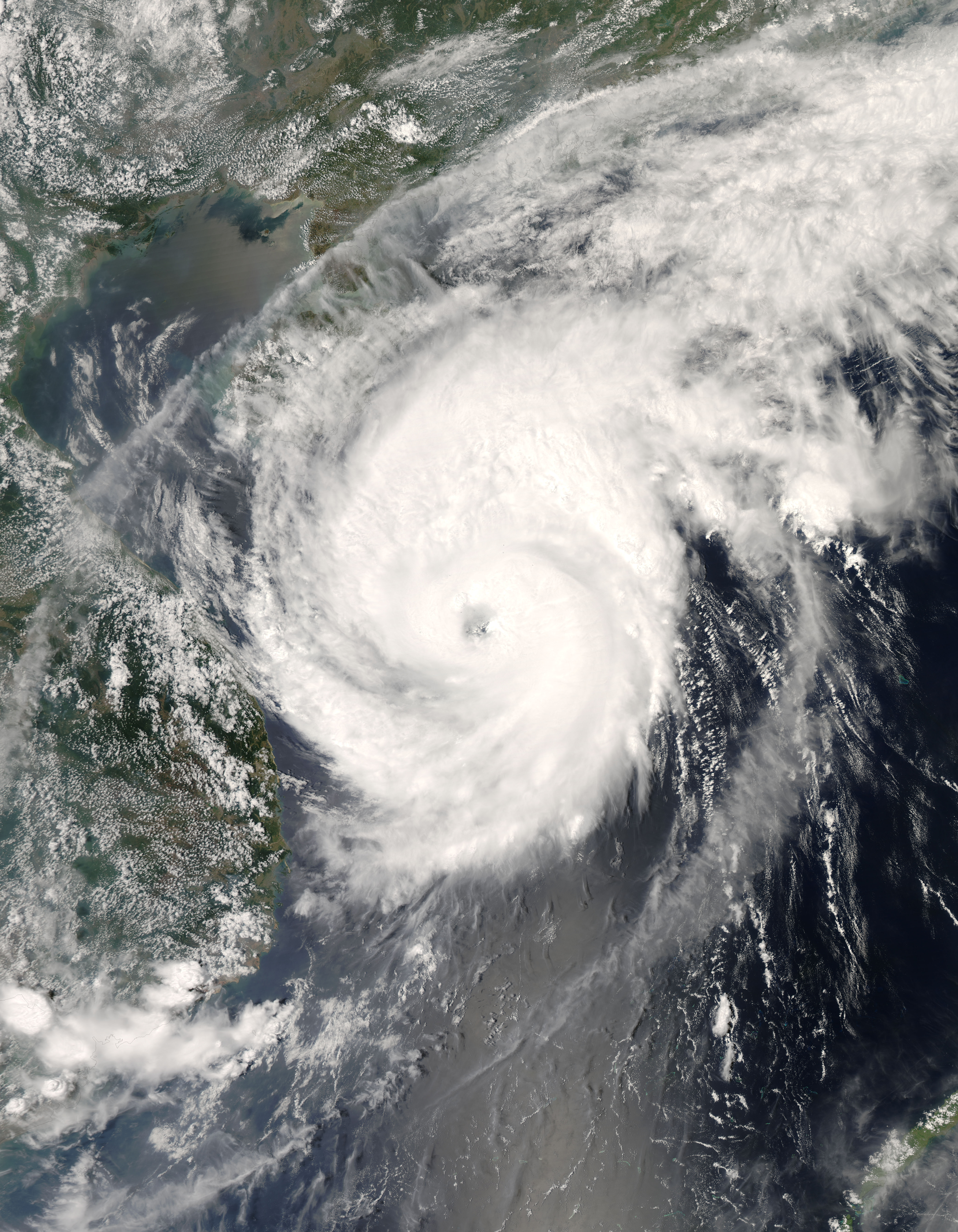
- Typhoon Neoguri near peak intensity on April 17

Meteorological history
- Formed: April 13, 2008
- Extratropical: April 20, 2008
- Dissipated: April 21, 2008

Typhoon
- 10-minute sustained (JMA)
- Highest winds: 150 km/h (90 mph)
- Lowest pressure: 960 hPa (mbar); 28.35 inHg

Category 3-equivalent typhoon
- 1-minute sustained (SSHWS/JTWC)
- Highest winds: 185 km/h (115 mph)
- Lowest pressure: 948 hPa (mbar); 27.99 inHg

Overall effects
- Fatalities: 26 total
- Damage: $65 million (2008 USD)
- Areas affected: Philippines, China
- IBTrACS
- Part of the 2008 Pacific typhoon season

Typhoon Neoguri, (Note: The name Neoguri (Korean: 너구리, [nʌ̹ɡuɾi]) was contributed by South Korea and means raccoon dog (Nyctereutes procyonoides) in Korean.) known in the Philippines as Typhoon Ambo, was the earliest tropical cyclone on record to strike China since Typhoon Chanchu in 2006. The first named storm in the 2008 Pacific typhoon season, it formed from a low pressure area on April 13 to the east of the Philippine island of Mindanao, and after crossing the island it intensified into a tropical storm in the South China Sea. Environmental conditions allowed for quick strengthening, with Neoguri attaining typhoon status on April 16. The typhoon reached its peak intensity on April 18 as it approached the island of Hainan, and subsequently it turned northward. Due to increased wind shear and cooler waters, Neoguri rapidly weakened and made landfall as a minimal tropical storm in southern China on April 19.

In the southern Philippines, the storm brought heavy rainfall, which left a person missing when a boat capsized. The typhoon left 40 fishermen missing in the South China Sea. Neoguri brought heavy rainfall as it made its final landfall on China, causing moderate damage totaling over ¥296 million (2008 RMB, $42 million 2008 USD). Three deaths occurred in China.

== Meteorological history ==
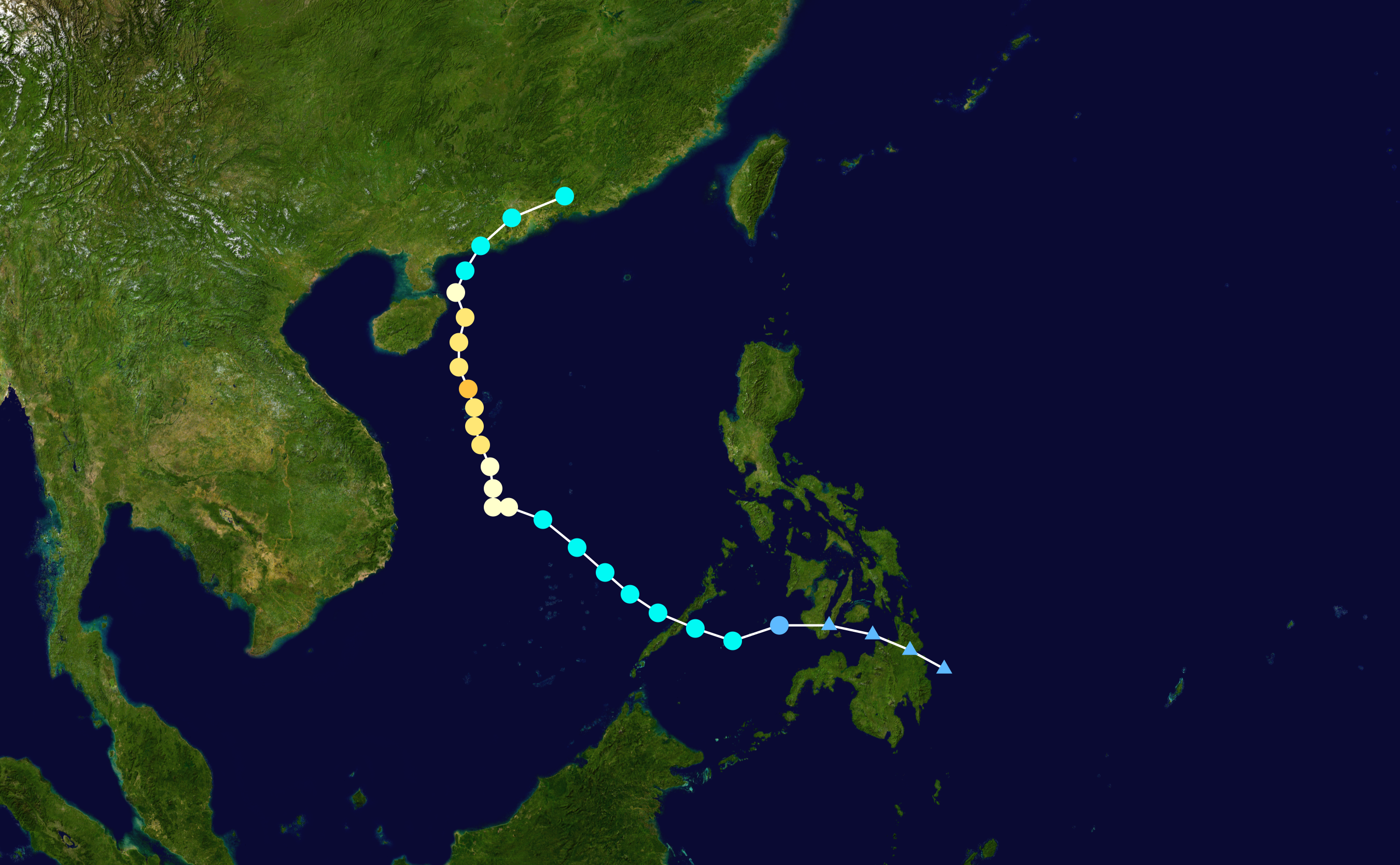
Map plotting the storm's track and intensity, according to the Saffir–Simpson scale Map key Saffir–Simpson scale Tropical depression (≤38 mph, ≤62 km/h) Tropical storm (39–73 mph, 63–118 km/h) Category 1 (74–95 mph, 119–153 km/h) Category 2 (96–110 mph, 154–177 km/h) Category 3 (111–129 mph, 178–208 km/h) Category 4 (130–156 mph, 209–251 km/h) Category 5 (≥157 mph, ≥252 km/h) Unknown Storm type Tropical cyclone Subtropical cyclone Extratropical cyclone, remnant low, tropical disturbance, or monsoon depression

An area of disorganized convection persisted east-northeast of Palau on April 11 in association with a sharp easterly wave, and within the system, a low pressure area was evident between Palau and Yap. Located beneath a developing anticyclone, with limited wind shear and enhanced diffluence, the system encountered favorable conditions for development. By April 13, a low-level circulation had formed and started consolidating about 260 km (160 mi) southeast of Bislig on Mindanao island in the Philippines. At around the same time, weak rainbands began wrapping into the center. At 1200 UTC on April 13, the JMA classified it as a weak tropical depression. Its development was impeded somewhat as it crossed Mindanao and Negros island, though the circulation consolidated while convective banding features increased. Later that day, the Philippine Atmospheric, Geophysical and Astronomical Services Administration (PAGASA) classified the system as Tropical Depression Ambo, and early on April 14 the Joint Typhoon Warning Center (JTWC) classified it as Tropical Depression 02W about 300 km (185 mi north of the Zamboanga Peninsula). Also, PAGASA declared "Ambo" at 0300 UTC April 14 to be within Dumaguete.

The depression continued westward, along the southern periphery of a strong subtropical ridge extending from southeastern Asia to north of Luzon. After it entered the Sulu Sea, the convection and circulation continued to consolidate, while its anticyclone aloft provided excellent outflow. Based on satellite intensity estimates using the Dvorak technique, the JTWC upgraded the depression to Tropical Storm 02W midday on April 14. At 0000 UTC on April 15, the JMA classified the system as a full tropical depression, and six hours later the agency upgraded it to Tropical Storm Neoguri after it crossed Palawan island into the South China Sea. Shortly thereafter, the PAGASA issued its last advisory on the cyclone as the storm moved out of their area of warning responsibility.

After attaining tropical storm status, significant intensification was limited due to a slight increase in wind shear as well as impeded outflow. The slowing of the strengthening trend was temporary, and by early on April 16 the organization had rapidly improved. As a result, the JMA upgraded Neoguri to a severe tropical storm. Warm water temperatures contributed to further intensification, and an eye formed in the center of the convection. At 1200 UTC on April 16, the JMA classified Neoguri as a typhoon about 350 km (220 mi) east of Qui Nhon, Vietnam. An approaching mid-level trough turned the typhoon northwestward, which enhanced outflow and contributed to further intensification. Late on April 17, the JTWC assessed Neoguri as attaining peak winds of 175 km/h (110 mph), averaged over a duration of one minute, near the Paracel Islands. Early the next day, the JMA estimated Neoguri reached its peak intensity with ten-minute sustained winds of 150 km/h (90 mph), about 190 km (120 mi) east of Sanya on the southern tip of Hainan.

3D TRMM of Typhoon Neoguri on April 17

Typhoon Neoguri underwent an eyewall replacement cycle around the time it reached peak intensity; the inner eyewall collapsed, and the outer eyewall contracted to a diameter of 65 km (40 mi). Upon attaining peak winds, the typhoon had turned northward, and the China Meteorological Administration assessed Neoguri as moving ashore along Hainan island near Wenchang. However, other agencies assessed the typhoon as tracking parallel to the eastern coastline just offshore. Land interaction and wind shear weakened the typhoon, and by April 19 it had weakened to a tropical storm. Cooler waters contributed to further weakening, causing its convection to diminish significantly and for its circulation to become elongated. After turning to the north-northeast, Neoguri made landfall on Guangdong province in southern China, a short distance west of Macau as a weak tropical storm. Neoguri made landfall on China earlier than any other tropical cyclone on record, about two weeks prior to the previous record set by Typhoon Wanda in 1971. Shortly after moving ashore, the JTWC issued its final warning as the cyclone began dissipating.

== Preparations and impact ==
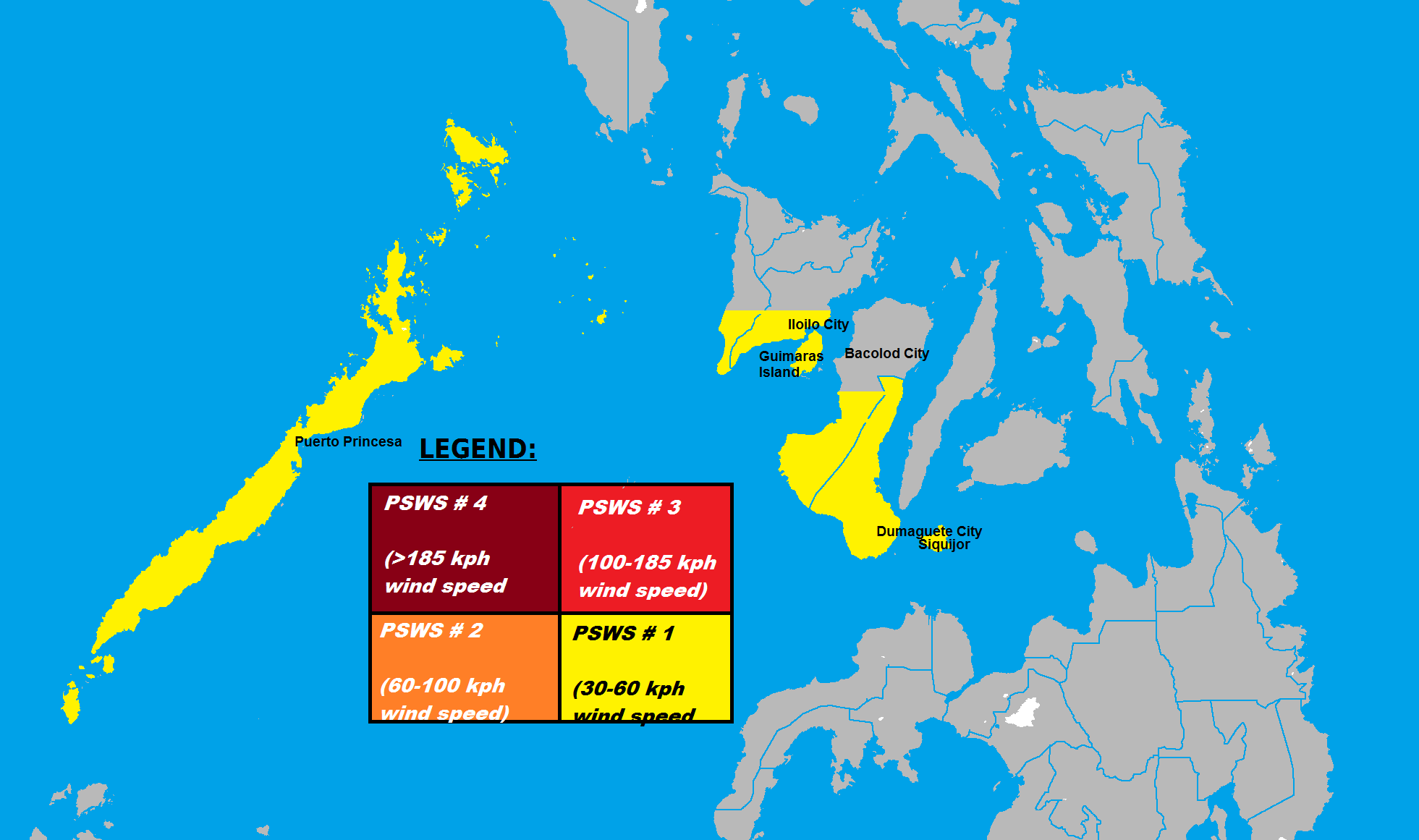
PSWS Map of the Philippines during the passage of Neoguri (Ambo)

As Ambo (Neoguri) passed directly through many parts Visayas and Mindanao, PAGASA issued Public Storm Warning Signals for these areas. Signal number one was issued for southern Negros, Siquijor and Camiguin. This storm signal was later scaled back up until the storm reached Palawan and the South China Sea.

As a tropical depression, Neoguri (Ambo) brought heavy rainfall to many portions of the Philippines, including even Metro Manila. In Cebu City, the precipitation caused flooding, which forced 62 people to evacuate their houses. In the Camotes Islands, rough waves capsized a motorboat with six passengers; five were rescued, with the other reported missing. But the storm at least alleviated for a few days the heat that has been experienced over Luzon from the past weeks. However, the storm did not stop the Palarong Pambansa (National Games in the Philippines) which was held in Puerto Princesa City in Palawan, one of the areas said by PAGASA to see stormy weather.

In preparation for the storm, about 21,800 fishing boats in the Chinese province of Hainan returned to port, and about 120,000 people evacuated from fish farms and low-lying areas on the island. Officials halted ferry service between Hainan and the Leizhou Peninsula in Guangdong province. Offshore, 56 fishermen rode out the storm in a shelter on the Paracel Islands; 38 people were rescued shortly after the storm, and initially eighteen people were reported missing. The eighteen missing fishermen were found thirty hours after Neoguri struck. The ship they were on had sunk, and the crew clung to debris and made makeshift rafts to survive in the waters. However, another 18 Chinese fisherman and 22 Vietnamese fisherman remain missing. On Hainan island, the storm left the city of Wenchang without power.

Along the mainland, ferry service was temporarily stopped between Hong Kong and Macau. At the Hong Kong International Airport, over 200 flights were delayed due to the threat of the storm; additionally, around 30 were canceled, and 66 others were deviated elsewhere. The Hong Kong Observatory issued a standby warning signal on April 17, which was the second earliest standby signal on record. One day later, the No. 3 strong wind signal was issued, the earliest in record. As it moved ashore, the storm brought heavy rainfall, with one station reporting 237 mm (9.35 in) in one day. Strong winds downed coconut and banana trees, with agricultural damage totaling over ¥200 million (2008 RMB, $28 million 2008 USD). Structural damage amounted to ¥96 million (2008 RMB, $14 million 2008 USD). Three fatalities were confirmed in China, two due to a road being covered in a mud flow, and another due to winds blowing a sheet of aluminum into a person, throwing them off the roof of a stadium.

== See also ==
- Other tropical cyclones named Neoguri
- Other tropical cyclones named Ambo
- Timeline of the 2008 Pacific typhoon season
