= Typhoon Mawar (2012) =

Pacific typhoon in 2012

Typhoon Mawar (Ambo)
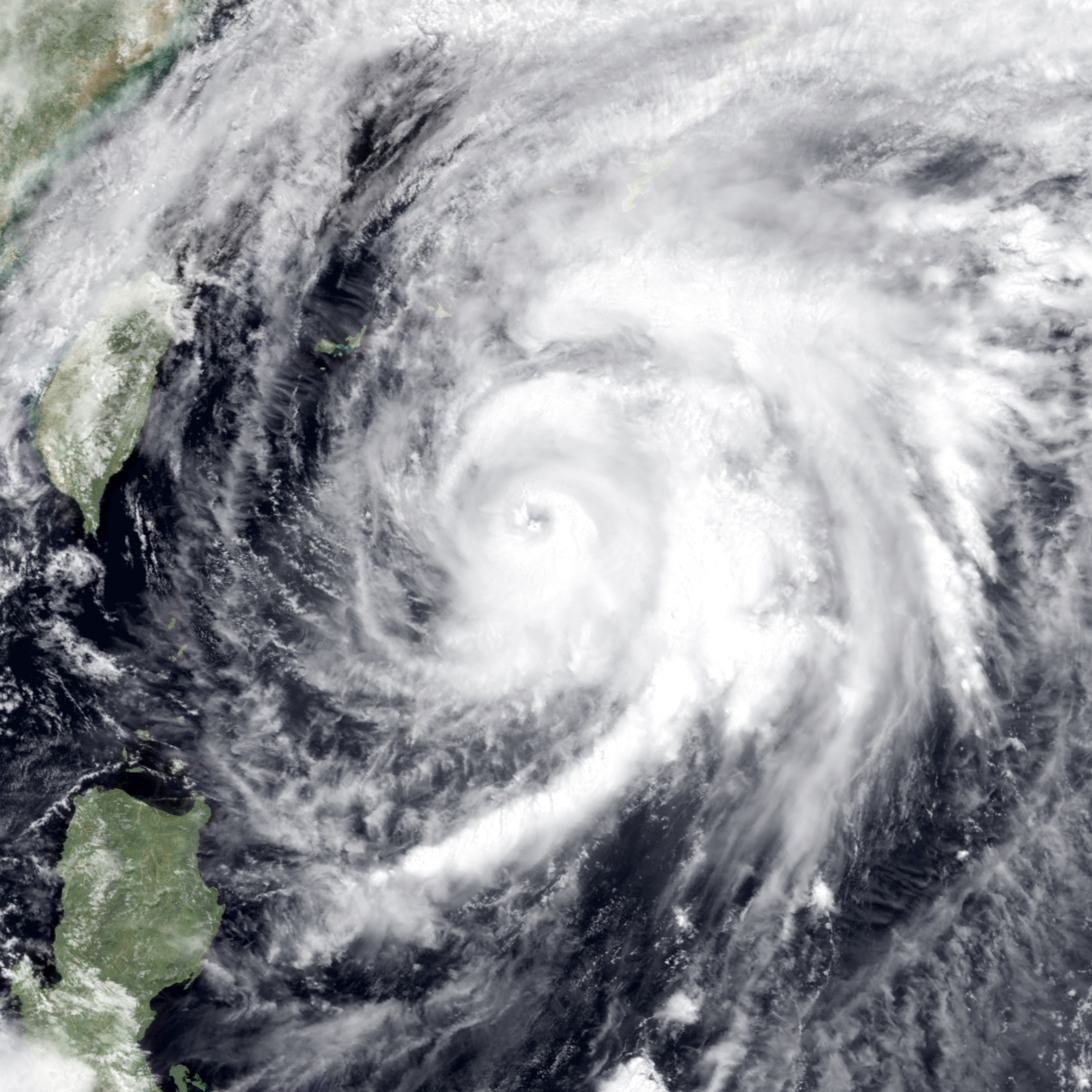
- Typhoon Mawar at peak intensity east of Taiwan on June 4

Meteorological history
- Formed: May 31, 2012
- Extratropical: June 6, 2012
- Dissipated: June 13, 2012

Typhoon
- 10-minute sustained (JMA)
- Highest winds: 140 km/h (85 mph)
- Lowest pressure: 960 hPa (mbar); 28.35 inHg

Category 3-equivalent tropical cyclone
- 1-minute sustained (SSHWS/JTWC)
- Highest winds: 195 km/h (120 mph)
- Lowest pressure: 944 hPa (mbar); 27.88 inHg

Overall effects
- Casualties: 3 dead, 3 missing
- Damage: Minimal
- Areas affected: Philippines, Taiwan, Japan
- IBTrACS /
- Part of the 2012 Pacific typhoon season

Typhoon Mawar, (Note: The name Mawar (Malay: mawar, [ˈma.war]) was contributed by Malaysia and means rose in Malay.) known in the Philippines as Typhoon Ambo, was a strong tropical cyclone which affected the Philippines in late May and early June 2012. The third named storm and the first typhoon of the 2012 Pacific typhoon season, Mawar developed from a tropical disturbance north of Palau on May 29. It was classified as a tropical depression two days later while situated northeast of Samar, prompting PAGASA to assign the name Ambo while inside the Philippine Area of Responsibility.

The depression tracked northwestward and strengthened to Tropical Storm Mawar on June 1. On the next day, Mawar strengthened to a severe tropical storm while turning north-northeast. It achieved typhoon status on June 3 and attained peak intensity on the next day, southeast of the Ryukyu Islands. As Mawar gained latitude, it started to weakened, and dropped below typhoon strength on June 5. Meanwhile, Mawar began the extratropical transition while accelerated northeastward. Mawar became extratropical southeast of Japan on June 6. The extratropical remnants presisted for a week, and dissipated on June 13 over the western Aleutian Islands.

In its early stage, Mawar enhanced the southwest monsoon and brought rainfall to Luzon. Flights and sea transports were cancelled due to bad weather. Almost 1,000 people were stranded in the Bicol Region. Mawar killed three people, injured seven, and three went missing (Note: Although the final report written on June 13, 2012 stated that five people were missing, two of them were found alive, about two weeks after the final report.) in the Philippines. Nonetheless, overall impacts on the country was minor.

== Meteorological history ==
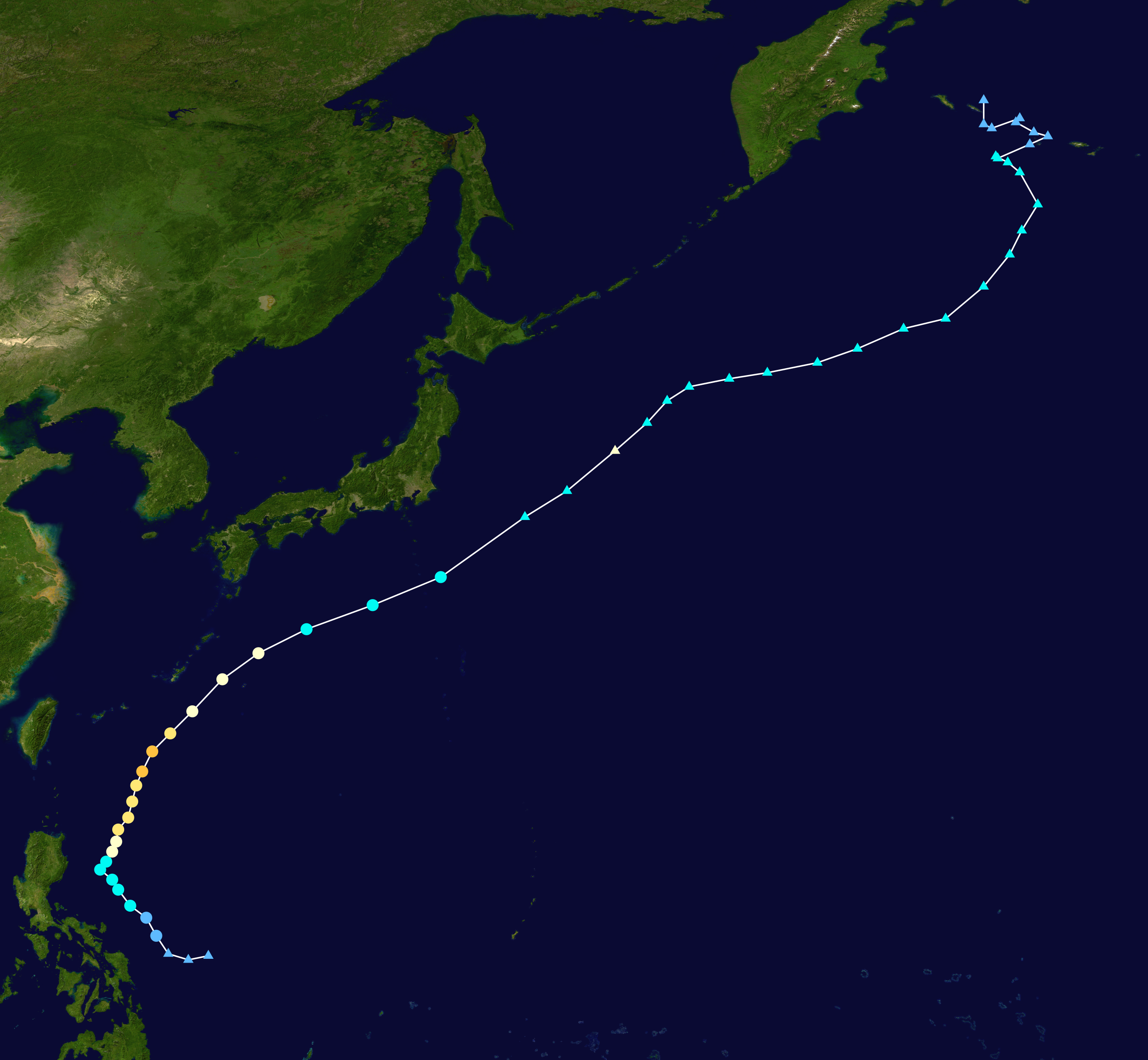
Map plotting the storm's track and intensity, according to the Saffir–Simpson scale Map key Saffir–Simpson scale Tropical depression (≤38 mph, ≤62 km/h) Tropical storm (39–73 mph, 63–118 km/h) Category 1 (74–95 mph, 119–153 km/h) Category 2 (96–110 mph, 154–177 km/h) Category 3 (111–129 mph, 178–208 km/h) Category 4 (130–156 mph, 209–251 km/h) Category 5 (≥157 mph, ≥252 km/h) Unknown Storm type Tropical cyclone Subtropical cyclone Extratropical cyclone, remnant low, tropical disturbance, or monsoon depression

On May 29, the Joint Typhoon Warning Center (JTWC) began watching an area of convection about 140 mi (230 km) north of Palau. The low-level circulation center was poorly defined, but a near-equatorial ridge provided good divergence and relatively low wind shear. On the next day, deep convection developed over the southern part of the center because of sea surface temperature of 30 °C (86 °F) while tracking northwestward. Later that day, deep convection increased and the system became more organized, which prompted the JTWC to issue a Tropical Cyclone Formation Alert (TCFA). At 15:30 UTC May 31, the Philippine Atmospheric, Geophysical and Astronomical Services Administration (PAGASA) initiated advisory on the system and gave the local name Ambo. At 18:00 UTC, the Japan Meteorological Agency (JMA) upgraded it to a tropical depression, and the JTWC followed suit three hours later, designating it as 04W. On June 1, deep convection increased further and wrapped into the center, which prompted the JTWC to upgrade the system to a tropical storm. The JMA followed suit later that day, and assigned the name Mawar.

Due to good radical outflow and low wind shear, Mawar continued to strengthen and developed a central dense overcast (CDO) later. The JMA upgraded Mawar to a severe tropical storm on June 2, while the JTWC upgraded it to a Category 1–equivalent typhoon, as microwave imagery revealed that an eye-like feature was developing and convection became stronger. Mawar turned northward along the western edge of a subtropical ridge. Early on the next day, the JTWC upgraded Mawar to a Category 2–equivalent typhoon, as satellite imagery showed that the storm had developed a ragged eye. Mawar turned north-northeast as a mid-latitude trough weakened the subtropical ridge to its northeast. The JMA upgraded Mawar to a typhoon later that day. Despite being asymmetrical, with the strongest convection was over the southern part of the center, Mawar still attained peak intensity early on June 4, with 10-minute sustained winds of 85 mph (140 km/h) and a barometric pressure of 960 hPa (28.35 inHg). Meanwhile, the JTWC also assessed that Mawar attained peak 1-minute sustained winds of 120 mph (195 km/h), making it a Category 3–equivalent typhoon on the Saffir–Simpson scale.

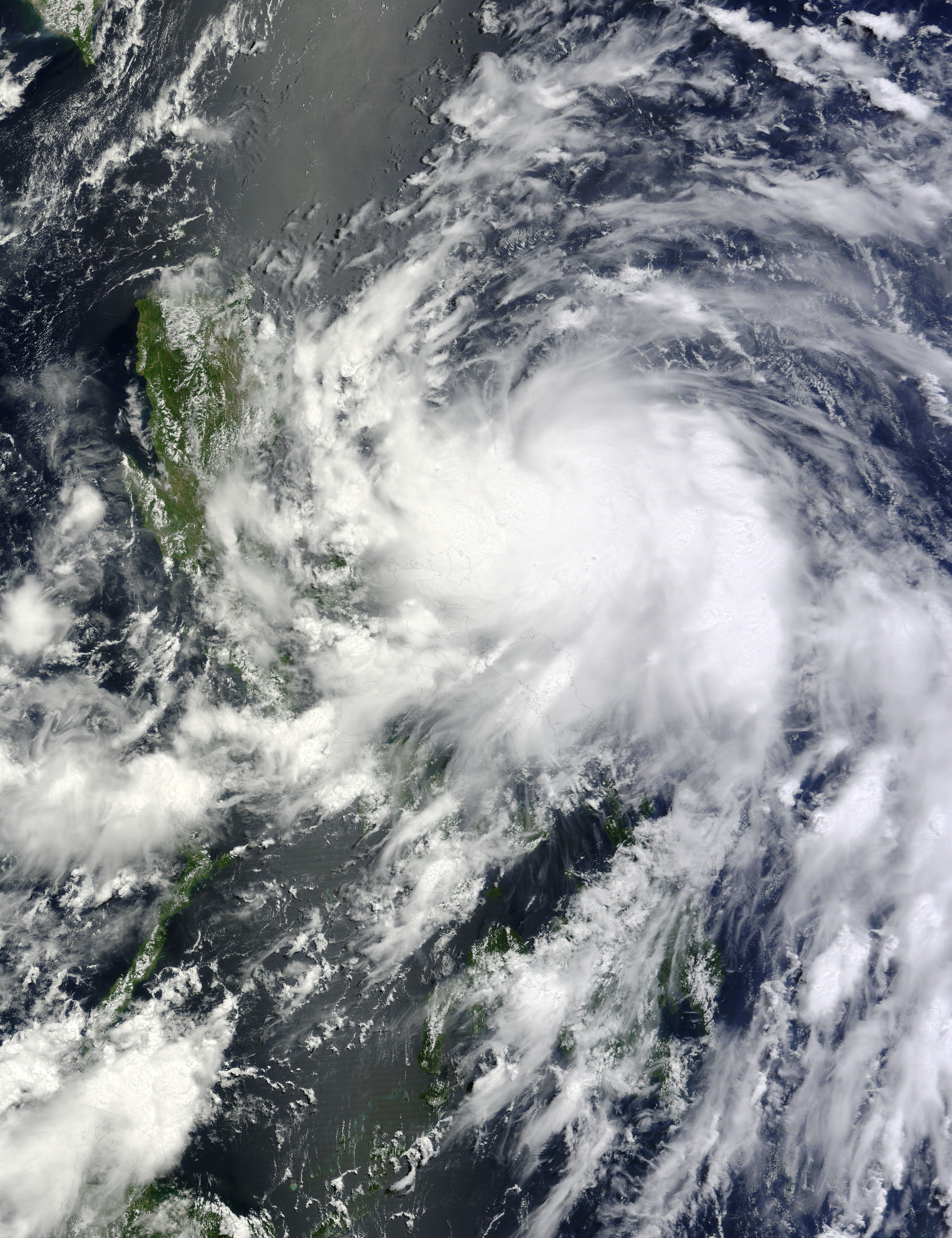
Tropical Storm Mawar east of Luzon on June 1

Mawar began to interact with the mid-latitude trough and the JTWC downgraded it to a Category 2–equivalent typhoon later that day. Convection in the northwestern quadrant weakened and the eye was broken down into tight spiral banding. Early on June 6, Mawar left the Philippine Area of Responsibility (PAR), and the PAGASA issued the final advisory on it. The circulation widen and became elongated due to increasing wind shear from the westerlies. The JTWC downgraded it to a Category 2–equivalent typhoon. Mawar also accelerated to the northeast as embedded into the jet stream. The JMA downgraded Mawar to a severe tropical storm shortly afterwards, as Mawar began the extratropical transition. Later that day, the JTWC downgraded Mawar to a tropical storm and issued the final warning on it. The transition completed on June 6, and the JMA issued the final advisory on it. The extratropical remnants continued to move northeastward and was last noted over the western Aleutian Islands on June 13.

== Preparations and impact ==
Shortly after formation, the PAGASA issued the PSWS #1 for Samar and Catanduanes. On June 1, the PSWS in Samar was cancelled, but the PSWS #1 extended to Camarines Sur, Camarines Norte, Polillo Island, Aurora and Isabela, and further to Cagayan later that day. On the next day, the PSWS in Camarines Sur, Camarines Norte and Polillo Island was lifted, but the PSWS #1 extended to the Babuyan Islands and the Batanes. Later that day, the PAGASA issued the PSWS #2 for Calayan Island and the Batanes, while the PSWS in northeastern Luzon and the Babuyan Islands remained at #1. The PSWS was gradually cancelled as Mawar began to turn northeast and moved away from the country. All the PSWS were lifted on June 3. The Philippine Coast Guard urged fishermen in Eastern Visayas not to navigate towards the sea, as weather condition deteriorated. 36 domestic flights were cancelled due to adverse weather brought by Mawar. 920 people were stranded in the Bicol Region due to cancellation of flights and sea transports. Most of them were in Tabaco.

Although Mawar didn't make landfall in the Philippines, it enhanced the southwest monsoon and brought rainfalls to Luzon and Visayas. Classes of pre-school and kindergartens were suspended for places under PSWS #1, while classes of primary and secondary schools were suspended for places under PSWS #2. A motor boat was broken down off the coast of Talisay. 24 people on board were rescued by the Philippine Coast Guard. The boat returned to Cebu City later. Mawar killed three people across the Philippines. In Busuanga, Palawan, two children were drowned in a river, while another child in Cainta, Rizal was drowned after falling into a river. On June 2, A sea vessel was out of fuel and was caught by strong winds and high waves off the eastern Catanduanes. 32 fishermen were rescued but other six were missing. One of the missing fishermen was found alive two days later, while another two was found alive in Cagayan on June 27. 16 people were injured during the typhoon. Nine people from the Natonin were injured due to an accident. In San Mateo, Rizal, five workers of Manila Water were hurt by a collapsed bridge foundation. Two people in Antipolo suffered minor injury after their houses were collapsed by a landslide. However, in the final report from the National Disaster Risk Reduction and Management Council (NDRRMC), nine injuries from Natonin appears to be unrelated to Mawar and thus they were removed from the injury list. Overall effects from the typhoon was minor.

== See also ==
- Other tropical cyclones named Mawar
- Other tropical cyclones named Ambo
- Typhoon Nida (2004)
- Tropical Storm Aere (2011)
- Typhoon Noul (2015)
- Tropical Storm Danas (2019)
- Typhoon Chanthu (2021)
