= List of storms named Ambo =

The name Ambo has been used for five tropical cyclones in the Philippine Area of Responsibility in the West Pacific Ocean:

- Tropical Depression Ambo (2004) (01W) – a tropical depression that was only recognized by PAGASA and JTWC.
- Typhoon Neoguri (2008) (T0801, 02W, Ambo) – a rare April typhoon that struck China.
- Typhoon Mawar (2012) (T1203, 04W, Ambo) – a strong typhoon that remained away from any landmass.
- Tropical Depression Ambo (2016) – a tropical depression that was only recognized by PAGASA.
- Typhoon Vongfong (2020) (T2001, 01W, Ambo) – a disastrous Category 3 storm that hit the Philippines, causing over ₱1 billion damage.

The name Ambo was retired after the 2020 season and replaced with Aghon, which refers to a mariner's compass in Hiligaynon.

== See also ==
- Cyclone Ambali (2019) – a South-West Indian Ocean tropical cyclone with a similar name.
