= Timeline of the 2008 Pacific typhoon season =

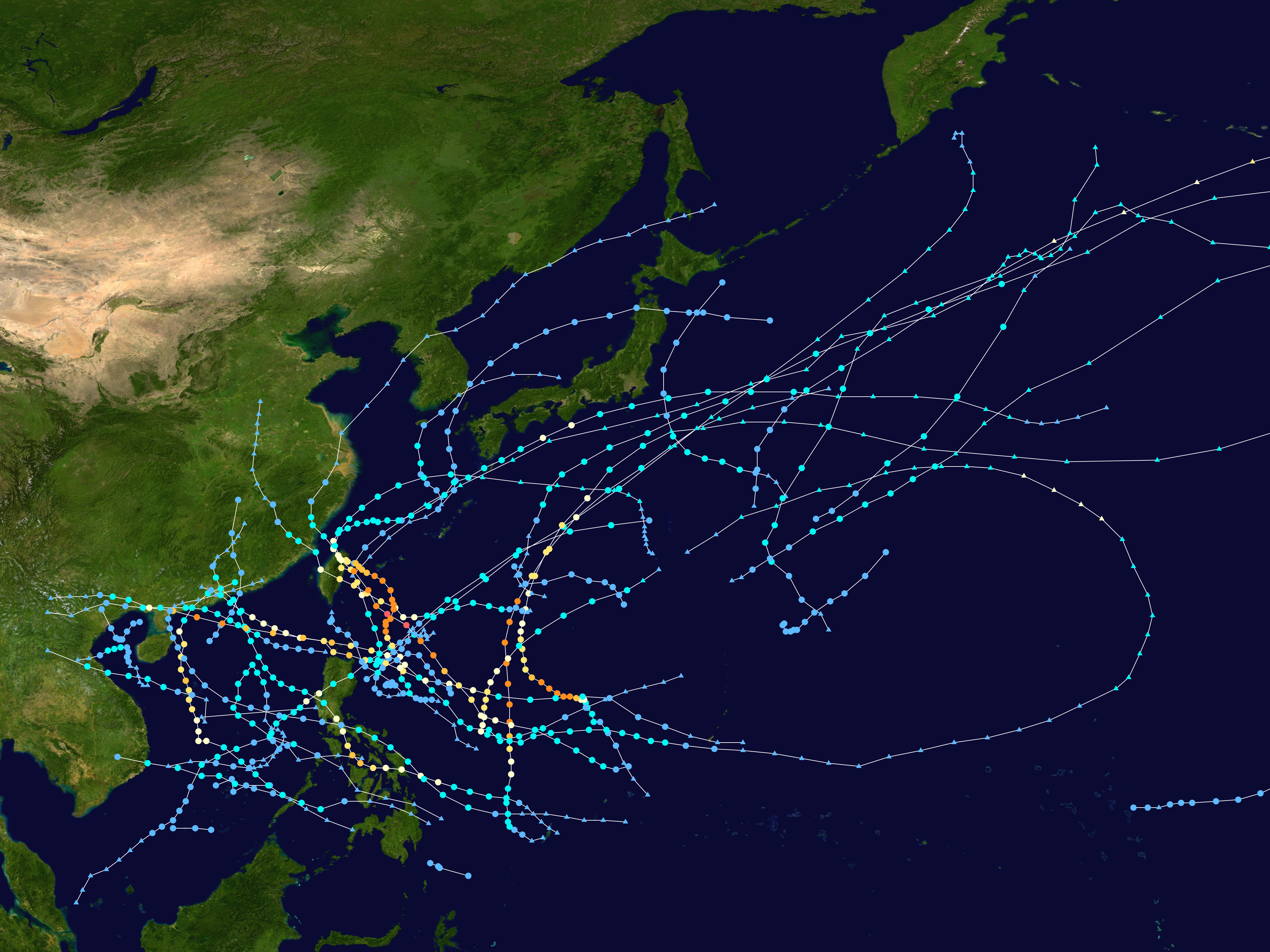
- Season summary map

Season boundaries
- First system formed: January 13, 2008
- Last system dissipated: December 18, 2008

Strongest system
- Name: Jangmi
- Maximum winds: 215 km/h (130 mph) (10-minute sustained)
- Lowest pressure: 905 hPa (mbar)

Longest lasting system
- Name: Sinlaku
- Duration: 13 days
Storm articles
- Neoguri
- Typhoon Rammasun (2008)
- Tropical Storm Halong (2008)
- Typhoon Fengshen (2008)
- Typhoon Kalmaegi (2008)
- Typhoon Fung-wong (2008)
- Tropical Storm Kammuri (2008)
- Typhoon Nuri (2008)
- Typhoon Sinlaku (2008)
- Typhoon Hagupit (2008)
- Typhoon Jangmi (2008)
- Tropical Storm Mekkhala (2008)
- Tropical Storm Higos (2008)
- Tropical Storm Maysak (2008)
- Typhoon Dolphin (2008)

This timeline documents all the storm formations, strengthening, weakening, landfalls, extratropical transitions, as well as dissipation during the 2008 Pacific typhoon season. The 2008 Pacific typhoon season officially started on January 1, 2008 and ended on January 1, 2009.

The first tropical cyclone of the season formed on January 13. The timeline also includes information which was not operationally released, meaning that information from post-storm reviews by the various warning agencies, such as information on a storm that was not operationally warned on, has been included.

During the year, a total of 40 systems were designated as Tropical Depressions by the Japan Meteorological Agency (JMA), who run the Regional Specialized Meteorological Centre in Tokyo, Japan. The JMA assigns names to Tropical Depressions should they intensify into a tropical storm.

The Philippine Atmospheric, Geophysical and Astronomical Services Administration (PAGASA) also assigns local names to tropical depressions which form within their area of responsibility. These names aren’t in common use outside of PAGASA's "Area of Responsibility". The Joint Typhoon Warning Center (JTWC) and other National Meteorological and Hydrological Services also issue warnings for the North-Western Pacific Ocean. The Joint Typhoon Warning Center warnings are referred to numerically to avoid confusion, as the JTWC sometimes recognises a storm at a different intensity compared to the JMA.

For the PAGASA, 21 systems formed or entered in their area during 2008, which 10 of them directly made landfall over the Philippines

== Timeline ==
=== January ===
January 1

- 0000 UTC – The 2008 Pacific typhoon season officially starts.

January 13

- 0600 UTC, (1400 UTC+8) – The JMA reports that a tropical depression has developed about 350 km, (220 mi), to the southwest of Manila in the Philippines.
- 0600 UTC, (1400 UTC+8) – The JTWC designates the tropical depression as 01W.
- 0600 UTC, (1400 UTC+8) – The CMA starts to monitor Tropical Depression 01W, as a tropical depression.
- 1200 UTC, (1400 UTC+8) – The CMA reports that Tropical Depression 01W has reached its two-minute sustained peak windspeeds of 55 km/h, (35 mph).

January 14

- 0000 UTC, (0800 UTC+8) – The JTWC reports that Tropical Depression 01W has intensified into a tropical storm.
- 1800 UTC, (0200 UTC+8, January 15) – The JTWC reports that Tropical Storm 01W had weakened into a tropical depression.

January 16

- 0600 UTC, (1400 UTC+8) – The JTWC reports that Tropical Depression 01W has weakened into a tropical disturbance.
- 0600 UTC, (1400 UTC+8) – The CMA reports that Tropical Depression 01W has weakened into a tropical disturbance.
- 1200 UTC, (2000 UTC+8) – The CMA issues its final advisory on Tropical Disturbance 01W.

January 17

- 1800 UTC, (0200 UTC+8, January 15) – The JTWC reports that Tropical Disturbance 01W has dissipated.

January 18

- 0000 UTC, (0800 UTC+8) – The JMA issues its final advisory on Tropical Depression 01W.

January 22

- 1200 UTC, (2000 UTC+8) –The JMA reports that a tropical depression has formed about 830 km, (535 mi), to the southwest of Manila in the Philippines.

January 23

- 0600 UTC, (1400 UTC+8) – The JMA issues its final advisory on the tropical depression as it weakens into an area of low pressure.

=== February ===
- There were no tropical depressions reported in the Northwestern Pacific during February.

=== March ===
March 26

- 1800 UTC, (0200 UTC+8, March 27) – The JMA reports that a tropical depression has formed about 1455 km (900 mi) to the southeast of Manila in the Philippines.

March 27

- 1200 UTC, (2000 UTC+8) – The JMA issues their final advisory on the tropical depression.

=== April ===
April 13

- 0000 UTC, (0800 UTC+8) — The JMA reports that a tropical depression has formed about 1000 km, (620 mi), to the southeast of Manila in the Philippines.
- 0600 UTC, (1400 UTC+8) – The tropical depression makes landfall on Mindanao Island in the Philippines.
- 2100 UTC, (0500 UTC+8, April 14) – PAGASA names the tropical depression, Ambo.

April 14

- 0000 UTC, (0800 UTC+8) — The JTWC designates Tropical Depression Ambo as 02W.
- 0000 UTC, (0800 UTC+8) — The CMA starts to monitor Tropical Depression 02W, (Ambo), as a tropical depression.
- 0600 UTC, (1400 UTC+8) — The JTWC reports that Tropical Depression 02W, (Ambo), has intensified into a tropical storm.
- 1500 UTC, (2300 UTC+8) — Tropical Depression 02W, (Ambo), makes landfall on Palawan Island in the Philippines.

April 15

- 0600 UTC, (1400 UTC+8) — The JMA reports that Tropical Depression 02W, (Ambo), has intensified into a tropical storm and names it as Neoguri.
- 0600 UTC, (1400 UTC+8) — The CMA reports that Tropical Depression Neoguri, (02W, Ambo), has intensified into a tropical storm.
- 1500 UTC, (2300 UTC+8) — PAGASA issues its final advisory on Tropical Storm Neoguri, (02W, Ambo), as the storm leaves its area of responsibility.

April 16

- 0000 UTC, (0800 UTC+8) — The JMA reports that Tropical Storm Neoguri, (02W, Ambo), has intensified into a severe tropical storm.
- 0000 UTC, (0800 UTC+8) — The JTWC reports that Tropical Storm Neoguri, (02W, Ambo), has intensified into a category 1 typhoon.
- 0000 UTC, (0800 UTC+8) — The CMA reports that Tropical Storm Neoguri, (02W, Ambo), has intensified into a severe tropical storm.
- 0600 UTC, (1400 UTC+8) — The CMA reports that Severe Tropical Storm Neoguri, (02W, Ambo), has intensified into a typhoon.
- 1200 UTC, (2000 UTC+8) — The JMA reports that Severe Tropical Storm Neoguri, (02W, Ambo), has intensified into a typhoon.

April 17

- 0000 UTC, (0800 UTC+8) — The CMA reports that Typhoon Neoguri, (02W, Ambo), has reached its peak two-minute sustained wind speeds of 150 km/h (90 mph).
- 0000 UTC, (0800 UTC+8) — The JTWC reports that Typhoon Neoguri, (02W, Ambo), has intensified into a category two typhoon.
- 0600 UTC, (1400 UTC+8) — The JMA reports that Typhoon Neoguri, (02W, Ambo), has reached its peak ten-minute sustained wind speeds of 150 km/h (90 mph).
- 1800 UTC, (0200 UTC+8, April 18) — The JTWC reports that Typhoon Neoguri, (02W, Ambo), has intensified into a category three typhoon.
- 1800 UTC, (0200 UTC+8, April 18) — The JTWC reports that Typhoon Neoguri, (02W, Ambo), has reached its peak one-minute sustained wind speeds of 185 km/h (115 mph).

April 18

- 1200 UTC, (2000 UTC+8) — The JTWC reports that Typhoon Neoguri, (02W, Ambo), has weakened into a category two typhoon.
- 1430 UTC, (2230 UTC+8) — Typhoon Neoguri, (02W, Ambo), makes landfall on Hainan island, China.
- 1800 UTC, (0200 UTC+8, April 19) — The JTWC reports that Typhoon Neoguri, (02W, Ambo), has weakened into a category one typhoon.
- 1800 UTC, (0200 UTC+8, April 19) — The CMA reports that Typhoon Neoguri, (02W, Ambo), has weakened into a severe tropical storm.

April 19

- 0000 UTC, (0800 UTC+8) — The JMA reports that Typhoon Neoguri, (02W, Ambo), has weakened into a severe tropical storm.
- 0000 UTC, (0800 UTC+8) — The JTWC reports that Typhoon Neoguri, (02W, Ambo), has weakened into a tropical storm.
- 0000 UTC, (0800 UTC+8) — The CMA reports that Severe Tropical Storm Neoguri, (02W, Ambo), has weakened into a tropical storm.
- 0615 UTC, (1415 UTC+8) — Tropical Storm Neoguri makes landfall on Guangdong province, in southern China.
- 0600 UTC, (1400 UTC+8) — The JMA reports that Severe Tropical Storm Neoguri, (02W, Ambo), has weakened into a tropical storm.
- 1200 UTC, (2000 UTC+8) — The CMA reports that Tropical Storm Neoguri, (02W, Ambo), has weakened into a tropical depression.
- 1800 UTC, (0200 UTC+8, April 20) — The JTWC issues its final advisory on Tropical Storm Neoguri, (02W, Ambo).
- 1800 UTC, (0200 UTC+8, April 20) — The JMA reports that Tropical Storm Neoguri, (02W, Ambo), has weakened into a tropical depression.
- 1800 UTC, (0200 UTC+8, April 20) — The CMA issues its final advisory on Tropical Depression Neoguri, (02W, Ambo).

April 20

- 0000 UTC, (0800 UTC+8) — The JMA reports that Tropical Depression Neoguri (Ambo) has dissipated.

=== May ===
May 7

- 0000 UTC, (0800 UTC+8) – PAGASA reports that Tropical Depression Butchoy has formed about 130 km (80 mi), to the west of Melekeok in Palau.
- 0000 UTC, (0800 UTC+8) – The JMA starts to monitor Tropical Depression Butchoy as a tropical depression.
- 0000 UTC, (0800 UTC+8) – The CMA starts to monitor Tropical Depression Butchoy, as a tropical depression.
- 0600 UTC, (1400 UTC+8) – The JTWC designates Tropical Depression Butchoy as 03W.
- 1800 UTC, (0200 UTC+8) – The JMA reports that Tropical Depression 03W (Butchoy), has intensified into a tropical storm and names it as Rammasun.
- 1800 UTC, (0200 UTC+8, May 8) – The JTWC reports that Tropical Depression Rammasun, (03W, Butchoy), has intensified into a tropical storm.
- 1800 UTC, (0200 UTC+8, May 8) – The CMA reports that Tropical Depression Rammasun, (03W, Butchoy), has intensified into a tropical storm.

May 8

- 1800 UTC, (0200 UTC+8, May 9) – The JMA reports that Tropical Storm Rammasun, (03W, Butchoy), has intensified into a severe tropical storm.
- 1800 UTC, (0200 UTC+8, May 9) – The CMA reports that Tropical Storm Rammasun, (03W, Butchoy), has intensified into a severe tropical storm.

May 9

- 0000 UTC, (0800 UTC+8) – The JTWC reports that Tropical Storm Rammasun, (03W, Butchoy), has intensified into a category 1 typhoon.
- 0600 UTC, (1400 UTC+8) – The JMA reports that Severe Tropical Storm Rammasun, (03W, Butchoy), has intensified into a typhoon.
- 0600 UTC, (1400 UTC+8) – The CMA reports that Severe Tropical Storm Rammasun, (03W, Butchoy), has intensified into a typhoon.
- 1200 UTC, (2000 UTC+8) – The JTWC reports that Typhoon Rammasun, (03W, Butchoy), has intensified into a category 2 typhoon.
- 1800 UTC, (0200 UTC+8, May 10) – The JTWC reports that Typhoon Rammasun, (03W, Butchoy), has intensified into a category three typhoon.
- 1800 UTC, (0200 UTC+8, May 10) – The CMA reports that Typhoon Rammasun, (03W, Butchoy), has intensified into a severe typhoon.

May 10

- 0000 UTC, (0800 UTC+8) – The JTWC reports that Typhoon Rammasun, (03W, Butchoy), has intensified into a category four typhoon.
- 1200 UTC, (2000 UTC+8) – The JMA reports that Typhoon Rammasun, (03W, Butchoy), has reached its 10-minute sustained peak wind speeds of 195 km/h, (120 mph).
- 1200 UTC, (2000 UTC+8) – The JTWC reports that Typhoon Rammasun, (03W, Butchoy), has intensified into a category four super typhoon.
- 1200 UTC, (2000 UTC+8) – The JTWC reports that Super Typhoon Rammasun, (03W, Butchoy), has reached its one-minute sustained peak wind speeds of 250 km/h, (155 mph).
- 1200 UTC, (2000 UTC+8) – The CMA reports that Severe Typhoon Rammasun, (03W, Butchoy), has intensified into a super typhoon.
- 1200 UTC, (2000 UTC+8) – The CMA reports that Super Typhoon Rammasun, (03W, Butchoy), has reached its peak 2-minute sustained windspeeds of 200 km/h,(125 mph).

May 11

- 0600 UTC, (1400 UTC+8) – The JTWC reports that Super Typhoon Rammasun, (03W, Butchoy), has weakened into a category four typhoon.
- 0600 UTC, (1400 UTC+8) – The CMA reports that Severe Typhoon Rammasun, (03W, Butchoy), has weakened into a typhoon.
- 1200 UTC, (2000 UTC+8) – The JTWC reports that Typhoon Rammasun, (03W, Butchoy), has weakened into a category three typhoon.
- 1800 UTC, (0200 UTC+8, May 12) – The JTWC reports that Typhoon Rammasun, (03W, Butchoy), has weakened into a category two typhoon.

May 12

- 0300 UTC, (1100 UTC+8) – PAGASA reports that Typhoon Rammasun, (03W, Butchoy), has left its area of responsibility and issues its final advisory.
- 0600 UTC, (1400 UTC+8) – The JTWC reports that Typhoon Rammasun, (03W, Butchoy), has weakened into a category 1 typhoon.
- 1200 UTC, (2000 UTC+8) – The JTWC reports that Typhoon Rammasun, (03W, Butchoy), has weakened into an extratropical system.
- 1200 UTC, (2000 UTC+8) – The CMA reports that Typhoon Rammasun, (03W, Butchoy), has weakened into a severe tropical storm.
- 1800 UTC, (0200 UTC+8, May 13) – The JMA reports that Typhoon Rammasun, (03W, Butchoy), has weakened into a severe tropical storm.

May 13

- 0000 UTC, (0800 UTC+8) – The JMA reports that Severe Tropical Storm Rammasun, (03W, Butchoy), has weakened into an extratropical cyclone.
- 0000 UTC, (0800 UTC+8) – The CMA reports that Severe Tropical Storm Rammasun, (03W, Butchoy), has weakened into an extratropical storm.

May 14

- 0600 UTC, (1400 UTC+8) – The JTWC reports that Tropical Depression 04W has formed about 350 km, (215 mi), to the northeast of Manila in the Philippines.
- 0600 UTC, (1400 UTC+8) – The JMA and the CMA start to monitor Tropical Depression 04W as a tropical depression.
- 0900 UTC, (1700 UTC+8) – PAGASA reports that Tropical Depression Cosme has formed about 450 km, (280 mi), to the southwest of Manila in the Philippines.
- 1200 UTC, (2000 UTC+8) – The JMA and the CMA start to monitor Tropical Depression Cosme as a tropical depression.

May 15

- 1200 UTC, (2000 UTC+8) – The JMA reports that Tropical Depression 04W, has intensified into a tropical storm and names it Matmo.
- 1200 UTC, (2000 UTC+8) – The JTWC designates Tropical Depression Cosme, as 05W.
- 1200 UTC, (2000 UTC+8) – The CMA reports that Tropical Depression Matmo, (04W), has intensified into a tropical storm.
- 1500 UTC, (2300 UTC+8) – PAGASA names Tropical Storm Matmo, (04W), as Dindo.
- 1800 UTC, (0200 UTC+8, May 16) – The JTWC reports that Tropical Depression Matmo, (04W, Dindo), has intensified into a tropical storm.

May 16

- 0000 UTC, (0800 UTC+8) – The JTWC reports that Tropical Storm Matmo, (04W, Dindo), has reached its one-minute peak sustained windspeeds of 75 km/h, (45 mph).
- 0000 UTC, (2000 UTC+8) – The JTWC reports that Tropical Depression 05W, (Cosme), has intensified into a tropical storm.
- 0000 UTC, (0800 UTC+8) – The CMA reports that Tropical Storm Matmo, (04W, Dindo), has reached its two-minute peak sustained windspeeds of 85 km/h, (50 mph).
- 0300 UTC, (1100 UTC+8) – PAGASA releases its final advisory on Tropical Storm Matmo, (04W, Dindo), as it leaves its area of responsibility.
- 0600 UTC, (1400 UTC+8) – The JMA reports that Tropical Storm Matmo, (04W, Dindo), has intensified into a severe tropical storm.
- 0600 UTC, (1400 UTC+8) – The JMA reports that Severe Tropical Storm Matmo, (04W, Dindo), has reached its 10-minute peak sustained windspeeds of 95 km/h,(60 mph).
- 0600 UTC, (1400 UTC+8) – The JMA reports that Tropical Depression 05W, (Cosme), has intensified into a tropical storm and names it as Halong.
- 0600 UTC, (1400 UTC+8) – The CMA reports that Tropical Depression Halong, (05W, Cosme), has intensified into a tropical storm.
- 1200 UTC, (2000 UTC+8) – The JMA reports that Severe Tropical Storm Matmo, (Dindo), has weakened into a tropical storm.
- 1200 UTC, (2000 UTC+8) – The JTWC issues its final advisory on Tropical Storm Matmo, (04W, Dindo), as it weakens into an extratropical storm.

May 17

- 0000 UTC, (0800 UTC+8) – The JMA reports that Tropical Storm Matmo, (Dindo), has weakened into a tropical depression.
- 0000 UTC, (2000 UTC+8) – The JMA reports that Tropical Storm Halong, (04W, Cosme), has intensified into a severe tropical storm.
- 0000 UTC, (0800 UTC+8) – The CMA reports that Tropical Storm Matmo, (Dindo), has weakened into a tropical depression.
- 0000 UTC, (0800 UTC+8) – The CMA issues its final advisory on Tropical Storm Matmo, (Dindo).
- 0000 UTC, (0800 UTC+8) – The CMA reports that Tropical Storm Halong, (04W, Cosme), has intensified into a severe tropical storm.
- 0600 UTC, (1400 UTC+8) – The JMA issues its final advisory on Tropical Storm Matmo, (Dindo), as it dissipates to the south of Japan.
- 0600 UTC, (1400 UTC+8) – The JMA reports that Severe Tropical Storm Halong, (04W, Cosme), has reached its ten-minute sustained peak wind speeds of 110 km/h (70 mph).
- 0600 UTC, (1400 UTC+8) – The JTWC reports that Tropical Storm Halong, (04W, Cosme), has intensified into a category 1 typhoon.
- 0600 UTC, (1400 UTC+8) – The CMA reports that Severe Tropical Storm Halong, (04W, Cosme), has reached its two-minute sustained peak wind speeds of 110 km/h (70 mph).
- 0900 UTC, (1700 UTC+8) – Severe Tropical Storm Halong, (04W, Cosme), makes landfall in the Pangasinan province, on Luzon island, Philippines.
- 1200 UTC, (2000 UTC+8) – The JTWC reports that Typhoon Halong, (04W, Cosme), has reached its one-minute peak sustained wind speeds of 250 km/h, (155 mph).
- 1500 UTC, (2300 UTC+8) – Severe Tropical Storm Halong, (04W, Cosme), makes landfall in the La Union province on Luzon island, Philippines.
- 1800 UTC, (0200 UTC+8, May 18) – The JTWC reports that Typhoon Halong, (04W, Cosme), has weakened into a tropical storm.

May 18

- 0000 UTC, (0800 UTC+8) – The JMA reports that Severe Tropical Storm Halong, (04W, Cosme), has weakened into a tropical storm.
- 0000 UTC, (0800 UTC+8) – The CMA reports that Severe Tropical Storm Halong, (04W, Cosme), has weakened into a tropical storm.
- 1800 UTC, (0200 UTC+8, May 19) – The JMA reports that Tropical Storm Halong, (04W, Cosme), has re-intensified into a severe tropical storm.
- 1800 UTC, (0200 UTC+8, May 19) – The CMA reports that Tropical Storm Halong, (04W, Cosme), has re-intensified into a severe tropical storm.

May 19

- 1800 UTC, (0200 UTC+8, May 20) – The JMA reports that Severe Tropical Storm Halong, (04W, Cosme), has weakened into a tropical storm.
- 1800 UTC, (0200 UTC+8, May 20) – The CMA reports that Severe Tropical Storm Halong, (04W, Cosme), has weakened into a tropical storm.
- 2100 UTC, (0500 UTC+8, May 20) – PAGASA reports that Tropical Storm Halong, (04W, Cosme), has moved out of its area of responsibility and issues its final advisory.

May 20

- 0600 UTC, (1400 UTC+8) – The JTWC reports that Tropical Storm Halong, (04W, Cosme), has weakened into an extratropical storm.
- 1200 UTC, (2000 UTC+8) – The JMA reports that Tropical Storm Halong, (04W, Cosme), has weakened into an extratropical storm.
- 1200 UTC, (2000 UTC+8) – The CMA reports that Tropical Storm Halong, (04W, Cosme), has weakened into an extratropical storm.

May 21

- 0000 UTC, (0800 UTC+8) – The CMA issues its final advisory on Extratropical Storm Halong, (04W, Cosme).

May 24

- 1200 UTC, (2000 UTC+8) – The JMA reports that the Extratropical Storm, Halong (04W, Cosme) has dissipated.

May 26

- 0600 UTC, (1400 UTC+8) – The JMA reports that a tropical depression has developed about 2145 km, (1330 mi), to the southwest of Manila, in the Philippines.
- 1800 UTC, (0200 UTC+8) – The JTWC designates the tropical depression as 06W.

May 27

- 0600 UTC, (1400 UTC+8) – The JMA reports that Tropical Depression 06W, has intensified into a tropical storm and names it Nakri.
- 0600 UTC, (1400 UTC+8) – The JMA reports that a tropical depression has formed about 500 km (310 mi) to the northwest of Manila in the Philippines.
- 1200 UTC, (2000 UTC+8) – The JTWC reports that Tropical Depression Nakri, (06W), has intensified into a Tropical Storm.

May 28

- 0000 UTC, (0800 UTC+8) – The JMA reports that Tropical Storm Nakri, (06W), has intensified into a severe tropical storm.
- 0600 UTC, (1400 UTC+8) – The JMA reports that Severe Tropical Storm Nakri, (06W), has intensified into a typhoon.
- 0600 UTC, (1400 UTC+8) – The JMA issues its final advisory on the tropical depression previously located to the northwest of Manila in the Philippines.
- 1200 UTC, (2000 UTC+8) – The JTWC reports that Tropical Storm Nakri, (06W), has intensified into a category one typhoon.

May 29

- 0000 UTC, (0800 UTC+8) – The JTWC reports that Typhoon Nakri has intensified into a category three typhoon.
- 0600 UTC, (1400 UTC+8) – The JTWC reports that Typhoon Nakri, (06W), has intensified into a category four typhoon.
- 0600 UTC, (1400 UTC+8) – The JTWC reports that Typhoon Nakri has reached its 1-minute sustained peak wind speeds of 230 km/h, (145 mph).
- 1200 UTC, (2000 UTC+8) – The JMA reports that Typhoon Nakri has reached its 10-minute sustained peak wind speeds of 185 km/h (115 mph).
- 2100 UTC, (0500 UTC+8, May 30) – PAGASA reports that Typhoon Nakri has moved into their area of responsibility and names it Enteng.

May 30

- 1200 UTC, (2000 UTC+8) – The JTWC reports that Typhoon Nakri (Enteng) has weakened into a category three typhoon.
- 1800 UTC, (0200 UTC+8) – The JTWC reports that Typhoon Nakri (Enteng) has weakened into a category two typhoon.

May 31

- 1800 UTC, (0200 UTC+8) – The JTWC reports that Typhoon Nakri (Enteng) has weakened into a category one typhoon.

=== June ===
June 1

- 1800 UTC, (0200 UTC+8, June 2) – The JTWC reports that Typhoon Nakri, (06W, Enteng), has re-intensified into a category two typhoon.

June 2

- 0300 UTC, (1100 UTC+8) – PAGASA issues its final advisory on Typhoon Nakri, (06W, Enteng), as it leaves its area of responsibility.
- 1200 UTC, (2000 UTC+8) – The JTWC reports that Typhoon Nakri, (06W, Enteng), has weakened into a category one typhoon.
- 1800 UTC, (0200 UTC+8, June 3) – The JTWC reports that Typhoon Nakri, (06W, Enteng), has weakened into a tropical storm.

June 3

- 0000 UTC, (0800 UTC+8) – The JMA reports that Typhoon Nakri, (06W, Enteng), has weakened into a Severe Tropical Storm.
- 0000 UTC, (0800 UTC+8) – The JTWC reports that Tropical Storm Nakri, (06W, Enteng), has weakened into an extratropical cyclone.
- 0600 UTC, (1400 UTC+8) – The JMA reports that Severe Tropical Storm Nakri, (06W, Enteng), has weakened into an extratropical cyclone.

June 6

- 0000 UTC, (0800 UTC+8) – The JMA reports that a tropical depression, has formed about 100 km, (60 mi), to the southeast of Taipei in Taiwan.
- 1800 UTC, (0200 UTC+8, June 7) – The JMA issues their final advisory on the tropical depression, that was previously located to the southeast of Taipei in Taiwan.

June 17

- 1800 UTC, (0200 UTC+8, June 18) – The JMA reports that a tropical depression has formed about 1600 km, (1000 mi), to the southwest of Manila in the Philippines.

June 18

- 0600 UTC, (1400 UTC+8) — PAGASA names the tropical depression: Frank.
- 1200 UTC, (2000 UTC+8) — The JTWC designates Tropical Depression Frank, as 07W.
- 1800 UTC, (0200 UTC+8, June 18) – The JTWC reports that Tropical Depression 07W, (Frank), has intensified into a tropical storm.

June 19

- 0000 UTC, (1200 UTC+8) — The JMA reports that Tropical Depression 07W, (Frank), has intensified into a tropical storm and names it Fengshen.
- 1200 UTC, (2000 UTC+8) — The JMA reports that Tropical Storm Fengshen, (07W, Frank), has intensified into a severe tropical storm.
- 1800 UTC, (0200 UTC+8, June 18) – The JMA reports that Severe Tropical Storm Fengshen, (07W, Frank), has intensified into a typhoon.
- 1800 UTC, (0200 UTC+8, June 18) – The JTWC reports that Tropical Storm Fengshen, (07W, Frank), has intensified into a category 1 typhoon.

June 20

- 0600 UTC, (1400 UTC+8) — Typhoon Fengshen, (07W, Frank), makes landfall on Eastern Samar, Visayas, in the Philippines.
- 1800 UTC, (0200 UTC+8, June 21) – The JTWC reports that Typhoon Fengshen, (07W, Frank), has intensified into a category 2 typhoon.

June 21

- 0000 UTC, (1200 UTC+8) — The JMA reports that Typhoon Fengshen, (07W, Frank), has reached its ten-minute sustained peak windspeeds of 165 km/h (105 mph).
- 0000 UTC, (1200 UTC+8) — The JTWC reports that Typhoon Fengshen, (07W, Frank), has intensified into a category 3 typhoon.
- 0000 UTC, (1200 UTC+8) — The JTWC reports that Typhoon Fengshen, (07W, Frank), has reached its one-minute sustained peak wind speeds of 165 km/h (105 mph).
- 1200 UTC, (2000 UTC+8) — The JTWC reports that Typhoon Fengshen, (07W, Frank), has weakened into a category two typhoon.
- 1800 UTC, (0200 UTC+8, June 22) – Typhoon Fengshen, (07W, Frank), makes landfall on Quezon Province, Luzon in the Philippines.
- 1800 UTC, (0200 UTC+8, June 22) – The JTWC reports that Typhoon Fengshen, (07W, Frank), has weakened into a category one typhoon.

June 22

- 0000 UTC, (0800 UTC+8) — The JMA reports that Typhoon Fengshen, (07W, Frank), has weakened into a severe tropical storm.
- 0600 UTC, (1400 UTC+8) — The JTWC reports that Typhoon Fengshen, (07W, Frank), has weakened into a tropical storm.

June 23

- 0900 UTC, (1700 UTC+8) — PAGASA reports that Severe Tropical Storm Fengshen, (07W, Frank), has moved out of its area of responsibility and issues its final advisory.

June 24

- 1800 UTC, (0200 UTC+8, June 25) – The JMA reports that Severe Tropical Storm Fengshen, (07W, Frank), has weakened into a tropical storm.
- 2130 UTC, (0530 UTC+8, June 25) — Tropical Storm Fengshen, (07W, Frank), makes landfall on Guangdong province, China.

June 25

- 0600 UTC, (1400 UTC+8) — The JMA reports that Tropical Storm Fengshen, (07W, Frank), has weakened into a tropical depression.
- 1200 UTC, (2000 UTC+8, June 26) – The JTWC reports that Tropical Storm Fengshen, (07W, Frank), has weakened into a tropical depression.
- 1800 UTC, (0200 UTC+8, June 26) – The JTWC reports that Tropical Storm Fengshen, (07W, Frank), has weakened into a tropical disturbance.
- 1800 UTC, (0200 UTC+8, June 26) – The JTWC issues its final advisory on Tropical Disturbance Fengshen, (07W, Frank).

June 27

- 0600 UTC, (1400 UTC+8) — The JMA reports that Tropical Depression Fengshen, (07W, Frank), has dissipated over land.

=== July ===
July 4

- 0300 UTC, (1100 UTC+8) — PAGASA reports that Tropical Depression Gener, has formed about 410 km (255 mi).

July 5

- 1500 UTC, (2300 UTC+8) — PAGASA issues its final advisory on Tropical Depression Gener, as it leaves its area of responsibility.

July 6

- 0600 UTC, (0200 UTC+8) — The JMA reports that a tropical depression has formed about 730 km, (455 mi), to the northeast of Saipan.

July 7

- 0600 UTC, (0200 UTC+8) — The JMA starts to monitor Tropical Depression Gener as a tropical depression.
- 0900 UTC, (1700 UTC+8) — Tropical Depression Gener makes landfall on Guangdong province in China.

July 8

- 0000 UTC, (0800 UTC+8) – The JMA issues its final advisory on Tropical Depression Gener, as it dissipates over Guangdong province.

July 9

- 0600 UTC, (0200 UTC+8) — The JMA issues its final advisory on the tropical depression previously located to the northeast of Saipan.

July 13
0000 UTC — The JMA reports that a Tropical Depression has formed about 2000 km (1240 mi) to the northeast of Manila in the Philippines.
0600 UTC — The JMA reports that a Tropical Depression has formed about 800 km (500 mi) to the northeast of Manila in the Philippines.
2100 UTC — PAGASA designates the Tropical Depression previously located about 800 km (500 mi) to the northeast of Manila in the Philippines, as Tropical Depression Helen.

July 14
0000 UTC — The JTWC designates Tropical Depression Helen as Tropical Depression 08W (Helen).

July 15
0600 UTC — The JMA reports that Tropical Depression 08W (Helen) has intensified into a tropical storm and is assigned the name Kalmaegi.
0600 UTC — The JTWC reports that Tropical Storm Kalmaegi (Helen) has intensified into a tropical storm.
0600 UTC — The JMA issue their final advisory on the tropical depression previously located about 2000 km (1240 mi), to the northeast of Manila in the Philippines.

July 16
0600 UTC — The JMA reports that Tropical Storm Kalmaegi (Helen) has intensified into a Severe Tropical Storm.

July 17
0000 UTC — The JMA reports that Severe Tropical Storm Kalmaegi (Helen) has intensified into a typhoon and reached its 10-minute sustained peak windspeeds of 120 km/h (75 mph).
0000 UTC — The JTWC reports that Tropical Storm Kalmaegi (Helen), has intensified into a category one typhoon.
0600 UTC — The JTWC reports that Tropical Storm Kalmaegi (Helen), has intensified into a category two typhoon and reached its 1-minute sustained peak wind speeds of 165 km/h (105 mph).
1200 UTC — The JMA reports that Typhoon Kalmaegi (Helen) has weakened into a severe tropical storm.
c1330 UTC — Severe Tropical Storm Kalmaegi (Helen) makes landfall near Ilan County in northern Taiwan.
1800 UTC — The JTWC reports that Typhoon Kalmaegi (Helen) has weakened into a category 1 typhoon.
2100 UTC — PAGASA reports that Severe Tropical Storm Kalmaegi (Helen) has left their area of responsibility, and issues their last advisory.

July 18
0000 UTC — The JMA reports that Severe Tropical Storm Kalmaegi (Helen) has weakened into a tropical storm.
0000 UTC — The JTWC reports that Typhoon Kalmaegi (Helen) has weakened into a tropical storm.
1200 UTC — Tropical Storm Kalmaegi (Helen) makes landfall on Ningde in Fujian Provence, China.
1800 UTC — The JMA reports that Tropical Storm Kalmaegi (Helen) has weakened into a tropical depression.

July 19
0000 UTC — The JTWC reports that Tropical Storm Kalmaegi (Helen) has weakened into a tropical depression.
1200 UTC — The JTWC reports that Tropical Depression Kalmaegi (Helen) has weakened into a tropical disturbance.

July 20
0600 UTC — The JTWC reports that Tropical Disturbance Kalmaegi (Helen) has become an extratropical low.
1200 UTC — The JMA reports that Tropical Depression Kalmaegi (Helen) has become an extratropical low.
1500 UTC — The extra-tropical low that was Typhoon Kalmaegi makes landfall on North Korea near Sunwi-do.

July 22
0000 UTC — The extratropical low that was Typhoon Kalmaegi makes landfall on Vrangel in Russia.

June 23
1800 UTC — The extratropical low that was Typhoon Kalmaegi makes landfall on the island of Sakhalin.

July 24
0000 UTC — The JMA reports that a tropical depression has formed about 1500 km (930 mi), to the northeast of Manila in the Philippines.
0300 UTC — PAGASA designates the tropical depression located to the northeast of Manila in the Philippines, as Tropical Depression Igme.
0600 UTC — The JTWC designates Tropical Depression Igme as Tropical Depression 09W.
1200 UTC — The JMA reports that the extratropical low that was Typhoon Kalmaegi has dissipated.

July 25
0000 UTC — The JTWC reports that Tropical Depression 09W (Igme), has intensified into a tropical storm.
0600 UTC — The JMA reports that Tropical Depression 09W (Igme), has intensified into a tropical storm and is named Fung-wong.

July 26
0000 UTC — The JMA reports that Tropical Storm Fung-wong (Igme) has intensified into a severe tropical storm.
1200 UTC — The JTWC reports that Tropical Storm Fung-wong (Igme) has intensified into a category 1 typhoon.

July 27
0000 UTC — The JMA reports that Severe Tropical Storm Fung-wong (Igme) has intensified into a typhoon.
0600 UTC — The JTWC reports that Typhoon Fung-wong (Igme) has intensified into a category 2 typhoon.
1200 UTC — The JMA reports that Typhoon Fung-wong (Igme) has reached its 10-minute sustained peak windspeeds of 140 km/h (85 mph).
1800 UTC — The JTWC reports that Typhoon Fung-wong (Igme) has reached its 1-minute sustained peak windspeeds of 175 km/h (110 mph).

July 28
0000 UTC — Typhoon Fung-wong makes landfall near Hualien, in Taiwan.
0600 UTC — The JMA reports that Typhoon Fung-wong (Igme) has weakened into a severe tropical storm.
0600 UTC — The JTWC reports that Typhoon Fung-wong (Igme) has weakened into a category 1 typhoon.
1200 UTC — The JTWC reports that Typhoon Fung-wong (Igme) has weakened into a tropical storm.
c1500 UTC — Tropical Storm Fung-wong (Igme) makes landfall near Putian, China.
2100 UTC — PAGASA issues its final advisory on Severe Tropical Storm Fung-wong (Igme) as the storm leaves its area of responsibility.

July 29
0000 UTC — The JMA reports that Severe Tropical Storm Fung-wong (Igme) has weakened into a tropical storm.
0600 UTC — The JTWC reports that Tropical Storm Fung-wong (Igme) has weakened into a tropical depression.
1200 UTC — The JMA reports that Tropical Storm Fung-wong (Igme) has weakened into a tropical depression.
1800 UTC — The JTWC reports that Tropical Depression Fung-wong (Igme) has weakened into a tropical disturbance.

=== August ===
August 1
0000 UTC — The JMA reports that Tropical Depression Fung-wong has dissipated.

August 3
1200 UTC — The JMA reports that a tropical depression has formed about 480 km (300 mi) to the north of Manila in the Philippines.
1500 UTC — PAGASA designates the tropical depression to the north of Manila in the Philippines as Tropical Depression Julian.
1800 UTC — The JTWC designates Tropical Depression Julian, as Tropical Depression 10W (Julian).

August 5
0000 UTC — The JTWC reports that Tropical Depression 10W (Julian) has intensified into a tropical storm.
0000 UTC — The JMA reports that Tropical Depression 10W (Julian) has intensified into a tropical storm and is named as Kammuri.
0300 UTC — PAGASA reports that Tropical Storm Kammuri (Julian) has left its area of responsibility and releases its final advisory.

August 6
0000 UTC — The JMA reports that Tropical Storm Kammuri (Julian) has intensified into a severe tropical storm and has reached its 10-minute peak wind speeds of 95 km/h (60 mph).
0600 UTC — The JTWC reports that Tropical Storm Kammuri (Julian) has reached its 1-minute peak windspeeds of 95 km/h (60 mph).
1200 UTC — Tropical Storm Kammuri (Julian) makes landfall on Yangjiang, China.
1200 UTC — The JMA reports that Severe Tropical Storm Kammuri has weakened into a tropical storm.

August 7
0600 UTC — The JTWC reports that Tropical Storm Kammuri (Julian) has weakened into a tropical depression.
1800 UTC — The JTWC reports that Tropical Depression Kammuri (Julian) has weakened into a tropical disturbance.
1800 UTC — The JMA downgrades Tropical Storm Kammuri to a tropical depression.

August 8
1200 UTC — The JMA reports that Tropical Depression Kammuri has dissipated.

August 9

- 1200 UTC, (2000 UTC+8) — The JMA reports that a tropical depression, has formed about 1445 km, (900 mi), to the southeast of Tokyo in Japan.

August 10

- 0600 UTC, (1400 UTC+8) — The JMA reports that the tropical depression, previously located to the southeast of Tokyo, has intensified into a tropical storm and names it Phanfone.
- 1800 UTC, (0200 UTC+8, August 11) — The JMA reports that Tropical Storm Phanfone, has intensified into a severe tropical storm.
- 1800 UTC, (0200 UTC+8, August 11) — The JMA reports that Severe Tropical Storm Phanfone, has reached its ten-minute sustained peak winds of 95 km/h (60 mph).

August 11

- 0000 UTC, (0800 UTC+8) — The JMA reports that Severe Tropical Storm Phanfone, has weakened into a tropical storm.
- 0000 UTC, (0800 UTC+8) — The JMA reports that a tropical depression, has formed about 250 km (155 mi), to the east of Hanoi in Vietnam.
- 0600 UTC, (1400 UTC+8) — The JMA issues its final advisory on Tropical Storm Phanfone, as it weakens into an extratropical low.

August 12

- 0000 UTC, (0800 UTC+8) – The JMA reports that a tropical depression has formed about 630 km, (400 mi), to the southeast of Shanghai in China.
- 0600 UTC, (1400 UTC+8) – The JMA issues its final advisory on the tropical depression, previously located to the east of Hanoi, Vietnam.

August 13

- 0000 UTC, (0800 UTC+8) – The JTWC designates the tropical depression previously located to the southeast of Shanghai, China, as Tropical Depression 11W.
- 1800 UTC, (0200 UTC+8, August 14) – The JTWC reports that Tropical Depression 11W has intensified into a tropical storm, and had reached its 1-minute peak windspeeds of 65 km/h (40 mph).

August 14

- 0000 UTC, (0800 UTC+8) – Tropical Disturbance Kika moves into the Western Pacific.
- 0600 UTC, (1400 UTC+8) – The Central Pacific Hurricane Center (CPHC) reports that Tropical Disturbance Kika has re-intensified into a tropical depression.
- 0600 UTC, (1400 UTC+8) – The JTWC reports that Tropical Storm 11W, has weakened into a tropical depression.
- 0600 UTC, (1400 UTC+8) – Tropical Depression 11W makes landfall on Chebu Island, in South Korea.

1200 UTC — The JTWC reports that Tropical Depression 12W has formed about 1500 km (930 mi) to the northeast of Manila in the Philippines.
1800 UTC — The JTWC downgrades Tropical Depression 11W to a Tropical Disturbance.
1800 UTC — The CPHC reports that Tropical Depression Kika has weakened into a tropical disturbance.
1800 UTC — The JTWC reports that Tropical Depression 12W has intensified into a tropical storm.
1800 UTC — The JMA designates Tropical Storm 12W as a Tropical Depression.

August 15

- 0000 UTC, (0800 UTC+8) – The CPHC reports that Tropical Disturbance Kika has re-intensified into a tropical depression.
- 0600 UTC, (1400 UTC+8) – The JTWC reports that Tropical Storm 12W has reached its 1-minute sustained peak windspeeds of 100 km/h (65 mph).
- 0600 UTC, (1400 UTC+8) – The JMA reports that Tropical Depression 12W has intensified into a tropical storm and names it as Vongfong.

1200 UTC — The JMA issues its last advisory on Tropical Depression 11W as it dissipates to the northeast of Japan.
1800 UTC — The CPHC reports that Tropical Depression Kika has weakened into a tropical disturbance.

August 16

- 0000 UTC, (0800 UTC+8) – The CPHC reports that Tropical Disturbance Kika has re-intensified into a tropical depression.

0600 UTC — The JMA reports that Tropical Storm Vongfong has intensified into a severe tropical storm, as it reaches its 10-minute sustained peak winds of 95 km/h (60 mph).

- 0600 UTC, (1400 UTC+8) – The CPHC reports that Tropical Depression Kika has dissipated.

1800 UTC — The JTWC reports that Tropical Depression 13W has formed about 350 km (220 mi) to the west of Songsong on the island of Rota.

August 17
0600 UTC — The JMA designates Tropical Depression 13W as a tropical depression.
1200 UTC — The JTWC reports that Tropical Depression 13W has intensified into a tropical storm.
1500 UTC — PAGASA designates Tropical Depression 13W as Tropical Depression Karen.
1800 UTC — The JMA reports that Tropical Depression 13W (Karen), has intensified into a Tropical Storm and names it as Nuri.
1800 UTC — The JTWC reports that Tropical Storm Vongfong has weakened into an extratropical low.

August 18
0000 UTC — The JMA reports that Severe Tropical Storm Vongfong has weakened into an extratropical low.
1200 UTC — The JMA reports that Tropical Storm Nuri (Karen) has intensified into a severe tropical storm.
1200 UTC — The JTWC reports that Tropical Storm Nuri (Karen) has intensified into a category 1 typhoon.
1800 UTC — The JMA reports that Severe Tropical Storm Nuri (Karen) has intensified into a typhoon.
1800 UTC — The JMA reports that the extratropical low that was Severe Tropical Storm Vongfong has moved out of its area of responsibility.

August 19
0600 UTC — The JTWC reports that Typhoon Nuri (Karen) has intensified into a category 2 typhoon.
0600 UTC — The JMA reports that Typhoon Nuri (Karen) has reached its 10-minute maximum sustained peak wind speeds of 140 km/h (85 mph).

August 20
0000 UTC — The JTWC reports that Typhoon Nuri (Karen) has intensified into a category 3 typhoon as it reaches its 1-minute maximum sustained peak wind speeds of 185 km/h (115 mph).
0600 UTC — The JTWC reports that Typhoon Nuri (Karen) has weakened into a category 2 typhoon.
1800 UTC — The JTWC reports that Typhoon Nuri (Karen) has weakened into a category 1 typhoon.

August 21
0900 UTC — PAGASA issues its final advisory on Typhoon Nuri (Karen) as it leaves its area of responsibility.
1800 UTC — The JMA reports that Typhoon Nuri (Karen) has weakened into a severe tropical storm.

August 22
0000 UTC — The JTWC reports that Typhoon Nuri (Karen) has weakened into a Tropical Storm.
1200 UTC — The JMA reports that Severe Tropical Storm Nuri (Karen) has weakened into a Tropical Storm.
1200 UTC — Tropical Storm Nuri (Karen) makes landfall on China near Hong Kong.
1800 UTC — The JTWC reports that Tropical Storm Nuri (Karen) has weakened into a tropical depression.

August 23
0000 UTC — The JMA reports that Tropical Storm Nuri (Karen) has weakened into a tropical depression.
0000 UTC — The JTWC reports that Tropical Depression Nuri (Karen) has weakened into a tropical disturbance.
0600 UTC — The JMA reports that Tropical Depression Nuri (Karen) has dissipated.

August 25
0900 UTC — PAGASA reports that Tropical Depression Lawin has formed about 950 km (340mi) to the east of Manila in the Philippines.

August 26
0600 UTC — The JTWC designates Tropical Depression Lawin as Tropical Depression 14W (Lawin).

August 27
0000 UTC — The JTWC reports that Tropical Depression 14W (Lawin) has intensified into a tropical storm as it reaches its peak windspeeds of 65 km/h (40 mph).
0900 UTC — The JTWC reports that Tropical Storm 14W (Lawin) has weakened into a tropical depression.

August 28
0600 UTC — The JMA issues their final advisory on Tropical Depression 14W (Lawin).
0900 UTC — PAGASA reports that Tropical Depression 14W (Lawin) has weakened into an area of low pressure and issues its final advisory.

August 29
0000 UTC — The JTWC reports that Tropical Depression 14W (Lawin) has weakened into a tropical disturbance.

=== September ===
September 7
1800 UTC — The JTWC reports that Tropical Depression 15W has formed about 680 km (425 mi), to the northeast of Manila in the Philippines.

September 8
0000 UTC — The JMA designates Tropical Depression 15W as a Tropical Depression.
0300 UTC – PAGASA designates Tropical Depression 15W as Tropical Depression Marce.
1200 UTC — The JTWC reports that Tropical Depression 15W (Marce) has intensified into a tropical storm.
1800 UTC – The JMA reports that Tropical Depression 15W (Marce) has intensified into a tropical storm and names it Sinlaku.

September 9
0600 UTC – The JTWC reports that Tropical Storm Sinlaku (Marce) has intensified into a category 1 typhoon.
0600 UTC – The JMA reports that Tropical Storm Sinlaku (Marce) has intensified into a Severe Tropical Storm.
0600 UTC — The JMA reports that a Tropical Depression has formed about 1100 km (685 mi) to the southeast of Tokyo, Japan.
1200 UTC – The JMA reports that Severe Tropical Storm Sinlaku (Marce) has intensified into a typhoon.
1800 UTC — The JTWC designates the Tropical Depression to the southeast of Tokyo, Japan as Tropical Depression 16W.
1800 UTC — The JTWC reports that Typhoon Sinlaku (Marce) has intensified into a Category 2 typhoon.

September 10
0000 UTC — The JTWC reports that Tropical Depression 16W has reached its 1-minute peak sustained windspeeds of 65 km/h (40 mph), which makes it a tropical storm.
0600 UTC — The JTWC reports that Typhoon Sinlaku (Marce) has intensified into a Category 4 typhoon.
1200 UTC — The JMA reports that Typhoon Sinlaku (Marce) has reached its 10-minute peak sustained windspeeds of 175 km/h, (110 mph).
1800 UTC — The JTWC reports that Typhoon Sinlaku (Marce) has reached its 1-minute peak sustained windspeeds of 230 km/h, (145 mph).

September 11
0600 UTC – The JTWC reports that Tropical Storm 16W has weakened into a tropical depression.
1800 UTC — The JTWC reports that Typhoon Sinlaku (Marce) has weakened into a category 3 typhoon.

September 12
0000 UTC – The JTWC reports that Tropical Depression 16W has become an extratropical cyclone.

September 13
0000 UTC — The JTWC reports that Tropical Depression 17W has formed about 1000 km (620 mi) to the southeast of Tokyo, Japan.
0000 UTC — The JMA designates Tropical Depression 17W as a tropical depression.
C1500 UTC — Typhoon Sinlaku makes landfall on Taiwan near Taipei.
1800 UTC — The JTWC reports that Typhoon Sinlaku (Marce) has weakened into a category 2 typhoon.

September 14
0600 UTC — The JTWC reports that Typhoon Sinlaku (Marce) has weakened into a category 1 typhoon.
0600 UTC – The JMA reports that Typhoon Sinlaku (Marce) has weakened into a severe tropical storm.
0600 UTC — The JTWC reports that Tropical Depression 17W has reached its 1-minute peak sustained windspeeds of 65 km/h (40 mph), which makes it a tropical storm.
0900 UTC — PAGASA reports that Severe Tropical Storm Sinlaku (Marce), has moved out of their area of responsibility.
1200 UTC — The JTWC reports that Tropical Storm 17W has become an extratropical cyclone.
1200 UTC — The JMA issues their final advisory on Tropical Depression 17W.

September 15
0000 UTC – The JTWC reports that Typhoon Sinlaku (Marce) has weakened into a tropical storm.

September 16
0000 UTC — The JMA reports that Severe Tropical Storm Sinlaku (Marce) has weakened into a tropical storm.

September 17
1200 UTC — The JMA reports that Tropical Storm Sinlaku (Marce) has intensified into a severe tropical storm.
1200 UTC — The JMA reports that a tropical depression has formed about 480 km, (300 mi), to the northeast of Hagåtña, Guam.

September 18
1800 UTC — The JTWC designates the tropical depression to the northeast of Hagåtña, Guam as Tropical Depression 18W.

September 19
0000 UTC — The JTWC reports that Tropical Storm Sinlaku (Marce) has intensified into a category 1 typhoon.
0000 UTC — The JMA reports that Severe Tropical Storm Sinlaku (Marce) has intensified into a typhoon.
0300 UTC — PAGASA designates Tropical Depression 18W, as Tropical Depression Nina.
0600 UTC — The JTWC reports that Tropical Depression 18W (Nina) has intensified into a tropical storm.
1200 UTC — The JTWC reports that Typhoon Sinlaku (Marce) has weakened into a tropical storm.
1200 UTC — The JMA reports that Tropical Depression 18W (Nina) has intensified into a tropical storm and names it as Hagupit.

September 20
0000 UTC — The JMA reports that Typhoon Sinlaku (Marce) has weakened into a severe tropical storm.
0000 UTC — The JMA reports that Tropical Storm Hagupit (Nina) has intensified into a severe tropical storm.
1200 UTC — The JTWC reports that Tropical Storm Sinlaku (Marce) has become an extratropical cyclone.
1800 UTC — The JMA reports that Severe Tropical Storm Sinlaku (Marce) has weakened into a tropical storm.

September 21
0000 UTC — The JMA reports that Tropical Storm Sinlaku (Marce) has become an extratropical cyclone.
1200 UTC — The JMA reports that Severe Tropical Storm Hagupit (Nina) has intensified into a typhoon.
1200 UTC — The JTWC reports that Tropical Storm Hagupit (Nina) has intensified into a category 1 typhoon.

September 22
0000 UTC — The JTWC reports that Typhoon Hagupit (Nina) has intensified into a category 2 typhoon.
1200 UTC — The JTWC reports that Typhoon Hagupit (Nina) has intensified into a category 3 typhoon.

September 23
1200 UTC — The JTWC reports that Typhoon Hagupit (Nina) has intensified into a category 4 typhoon as it reaches its 1 minute sustained peak windspeeds of 230 km/h, (145 mph).
1200 UTC — The JTWC reports that Tropical Depression 19W has formed about 600 km (380 mi) to the southeast of Hagåtña, Guam.
1800 UTC — The JMA reports that the extratropical cyclone that was Typhoon Sinlaku (Marce) has dissipated.
1800 UTC — The JMA reports that Typhoon Hagupit (Nina) has reached its 10-minute sustained peak windspeeds of 165 km/h (105 mph).

September 24
0000 UTC — The JTWC reports that Tropical Depression 19W has intensified into a tropical storm.
0000 UTC — The JMA designates Tropical Storm 19W as a tropical depression.
C 0300 UTC — Typhoon Hagupit (Nina) makes landfall on China near Zhanjiang.
0600 UTC — The JMA reports that Typhoon Hagupit (Nina) has weakened into a severe tropical storm.
1200 UTC — The JMA reports that Tropical Storm 19W has intensified into a tropical storm and names it as Jangmi.
1200 UTC — The JMA reports that Severe Tropical Storm Hagupit (Nina) has weakened into a tropical storm.
1200 UTC — The JTWC reports that Typhoon Hagupit (Nina) has weakened to a tropical storm.
2100 UTC — PAGASA names Tropical Storm Jangmi as Ofel.

September 25
0000 UTC — The JTWC reports that Tropical Storm Hagupit (Nina) has weakened into a tropical depression.
0000 UTC — The JMA reports that Tropical Storm Hagupit (Nina) has weakened into a tropical depression.
0000 UTC — The JMA reports that Tropical Storm Jangmi (Ofel) has intensified into a severe tropical storm.
0600 UTC — The JTWC reports that Tropical Depression Hagupit (Nina) has weakened into a tropical disturbance.
0600 UTC — The JMA reports that Severe Tropical Storm Jangmi (Ofel) has intensified into a typhoon.
0600 UTC — The JTWC reports that Tropical Storm Jangmi (Ofel) has intensified into a category 1 typhoon.

September 26
0000 UTC — The JMA reports that Tropical Depression Hagupit (Nina) has dissipated over Lai Chai provence in China.
0000 UTC — The JTWC reports that Typhoon Jangmi (Ofel) has intensified into a category 2 typhoon.
1200 UTC — The JTWC reports that Typhoon Jangmi (Ofel) has intensified into a category 3 typhoon.
1800 UTC — The JTWC reports that Typhoon Jangmi (Ofel) has intensified into a category 4 typhoon.

September 27
0000 UTC — The JTWC reports that Typhoon Jangmi (Ofel) has intensified into a category 4 super typhoon.
0600 UTC — The JTWC reports that Super Typhoon Jangmi (Ofel) has reached its 1-minute maximum sustained peak wind speeds of 270 km/h (165 mph) which makes it a category 5 super typhoon.
1200 UTC — The JMA reports that Typhoon Jangmi (Ofel) has reached its 10-minute maximum sustained peak wind speeds of 215 km/h (130 mph).
1800 UTC — The JTWC reports that Super Typhoon Jangmi (Ofel) has weakened into a category 4 typhoon.

- 1800 UTC, (0200 UTC+8, September 28) – The JMA reports that a tropical depression has formed about 1000 km to the southwest of Hanoi Vietnam.
- 1800 UTC, (0200 UTC+8, September 28) – The CMA starts to monitor the tropical depression.

September 28
C0900 UTC — Typhoon Jangmi makes landfall on Taiwan near Suao.
0900 UTC — The JTWC reports that Typhoon Jangmi (Ofel) has weakened into a category 3 typhoon.
1200 UTC — The JTWC reports that Typhoon Jangmi (Ofel) has weakened into a category 2 typhoon.
1800 UTC — The JTWC reports that Typhoon Jangmi (Ofel) has weakened into a category 1 typhoon.
1800 UTC — The JMA reports that a tropical depression has formed about 50 km (30 mi) to the northeast of Melekeok, Palau.

- 1800 UTC, (0200 UTC+8, September 29) – The JTWC designates the tropical depression as 20W.
- 1800 UTC, (0200 UTC+8, September 29) – The JMA reports that a tropical depression has formed about 1585 km (985 mi), to the southwest of Manila in the Philippines.
- 1800 UTC, (0200 UTC+8, September 29) – The CMA starts to monitor the tropical depression.

September 29
0000 UTC — The JTWC reports that Typhoon Jangmi (Ofel) has weakened into a tropical storm.
0000 UTC — The JMA downgrades Typhoon Jangmi to a severe tropical storm.
0300 UTC — PAGASA releases its final advisory on Tropical Storm Jangmi as it moves out of their area of responsibility.
0000 UTC — The JTWC downgrades Typhoon 19W (Jangmi) to a tropical storm.

- 0000 UTC, (0800 UTC+8) – The JMA reports that Tropical Depression 20W, has intensified into a tropical storm, and names it Mekkhala.
- 0000 UTC, (0800 UTC+8) – The CMA reports that Tropical Depression Mekkhala, (20W), has intensified into a tropical storm.
- 0300 UTC, (1100 UTC+8) – PAGASA names the Tropical Depression: Pablo.
- 0600 UTC, (1400 UTC+8) – The JTWC reports that Tropical Depression Mekkhala, (20W), has intensified into a tropical storm.
- 0600 UTC, (1400 UTC+8) – The JTWC designates Tropical Depression Pablo as Tropical Depression 21W, (Pablo).

0600 UTC — The JTWC designates the tropical depression to the northeast of Melekeok, Palau, as Tropical Depression 21W.
0900 UTC — PAGASA names Tropical Depression 21W as Pablo.
1200 UTC — The JTWC reports that Tropical Depression 21W has intensified into a tropical storm
1200 UTC — The JMA downgrades Severe Tropical Storm Jangmi to a tropical storm.

- 1200 UTC, (2000 UTC+8) – The JTWC reports that Tropical Depression 21W, (Pablo), has intensified into a tropical storm.
- 1200 UTC, (2000 UTC+8) – The CMA reports that Tropical Storm Mekkhala, (20W), has reached its two-minute sustained peak windspeeds of 85 km/h, (50 mph).
- 1800 UTC, (0200 UTC+8, September 30) – The JMA reports that Tropical Storm Mekkhala, (20W), has reached its ten-minute sustained peak windspeeds of 85 km/h, (50 mph).
- 1800 UTC, (0200 UTC+8, September 30) – The JTWC reports that Tropical Storm Mekkhala, (20W), has reached its one-minute sustained peak windspeeds of 100 km/h, (65 mph).
- 1800 UTC, (0200 UTC+8, September 30) – The JTWC reports that Tropical Storm 21W, (Pablo), has reached its one-minute peak maximum sustained windspeeds of 75 km/h (45 mph).

September 30

- 0000 UTC, (0800 UTC+8) – Tropical Storm Mekkhala makes landfall on the Quảng Bình Province in northern Vietnam.
- 0600 UTC, (1400 UTC+8) – The JTWC releases its final advisory on Tropical Storm Mekkhala, (20W).
- 1200 UTC, (2000 UTC+8) – The JMA reports that Tropical Storm Mekkhala, has weakened into a tropical depression.
- 1200 UTC, (2000 UTC+8) – The CMA reports that Tropical Storm Mekkhala, has weakened into a tropical depression.
- 1800 UTC, (0200 UTC+8, October 1) – The JMA and the CMA report that Tropical Depression Mekkhala has dissipated.
- 1800 UTC, (0200 UTC+8, October 1) – Tropical Depression 21W, (Pablo), makes landfall in Catanduanes province on Luzon island, Philippines.
- 2100 UTC, (0500 UTC+8, October 1) – Tropical Depression 21W, (Pablo), makes landfall in Camarines Sur province on Luzon island, Philippines.

C1200 UTC — Tropical Depression 21W (Pablo) makes landfall on Legazpi City in Luzon, Philippines.
1800 UTC — The JTWC reports that Tropical Storm 19W (Jangmi) has become an extratropical cyclone.

=== October ===
October 1

- 0000 UTC, (0800 UTC+8) – Tropical Depression 21W, (Pablo), makes landfall in Camarines Norte province on Luzon island, Philippines.
- 0600 UTC, (0800 UTC+8) – Tropical Depression 21W, (Pablo), makes landfall in Quezon province on Luzon island, Philippines.
- 0600 UTC, (1400 UTC+8) – The JTWC reports that Tropical Storm 21W, (Pablo), has weakened into a tropical depression.
- 0900 UTC, (1700 UTC+8) – Tropical Depression 21W, (Pablo), makes landfall in Bataan province on Luzon island, Philippines.

October 2

- 0000 UTC, (0800 UTC+8) – The JMA reports that Tropical Depression 21W, (Pablo), has intensified into a tropical storm and names it Higos.
- 0000 UTC, (0800 UTC+8) – The JMA reports that Tropical Storm Higos, (21W, Pablo), has reached its ten-minute peak maximum sustained winds of 65 km/h (40 mph).
- 0000 UTC, (0800 UTC+8) – The CMA reports that Tropical Depression Higos, (21W, Pablo), has intensified into a tropical storm.
- 0000 UTC, (0800 UTC+8) – The CMA reports that Tropical Storm Higos, (21W, Pablo), has reached its two-minute peak maximum sustained winds of 65 km/h (40 mph).
- 0900 UTC, (1700 UTC+8) – PAGASA issues its final advisory on Tropical Storm Higos, (21W, Pablo), as it moves out of their area of responsibility.

October 3

- 0600 UTC, (1400 UTC+8) – The JMA reports that Tropical Storm Higos, (21W, Pablo), has weakened into a tropical depression.
- 1415 UTC, (2215 UTC+8) – Tropical Depression Higos, (21W, Pablo), makes landfall on Hainan island, China.
- 1800 UTC, (0200 UTC+8, September 30) – The CMA reports that Tropical Storm Higos, (21W, Pablo), has weakened into a tropical depression.

October 4

- 0910 UTC, (1710 UTC+8) – Tropical Depression Higos, (21W, Pablo), makes landfall on Guangdong province in China.
- 1200 UTC, (2000 UTC+8) – The JTWC reports that Tropical Depression Higos, (21W, Pablo), has weakened into a tropical disturbance.

October 5

- 1200 UTC, (2000 UTC+8) – The CMA reports that Tropical Depression Higos, (21W, Pablo), has weakened into a tropical disturbance.

October 6

- 0000 UTC, (0800 UTC+8) – The JTWC issues its final advisory on Tropical Disturbance Higos, (21W, Pablo).
- 0600 UTC, (1400 UTC+8) – The CMA issues their final advisory on Tropical Disturbance Higos, (21W, Pablo).
- 1200 UTC, (2000 UTC+8) – The JMA reports that Tropical Depression Higos, (21W, Pablo), has dissipated over Guangdong province in China.

October 13

- 0000 UTC, (0800 UTC+8) – The JMA reports that a tropical depression has formed about 400 km (250 mi), to the southeast of Hà Nội in Vietnam.
- 0600 UTC, (1400 UTC+8) – The CMA starts to monitor the tropical depression.
- 1200 UTC, (2000 UTC+8) – The JTWC designates the tropical depression, as Tropical Depression 22W.

October 14

- 1200 UTC, (2000 UTC+8) – The JTWC reports that Tropical Depression 22W has intensified into a tropical storm.

October 15

- 0600 UTC, (1400 UTC+8) – The JTWC reports that Tropical Storm 22W has weakened into a tropical depression.
- 0900 UTC, (1700 UTC+8) – Tropical Depression 22W makes landfall on Ha Tinh Province in Vietnam.
- 1200 UTC, (2000 UTC+8) – The JTWC reports that Tropical Depression 22W has weakened into a tropical disturbance.
- 1200 UTC, (2000 UTC+8) – The JMA issues its final advisory on Tropical Depression 22W.
- 1200 UTC, (2000 UTC+8) – The CMA issues its final advisory on Tropical Depression 22W.
- 1800 UTC, (0200 UTC+8, October 16) – The JTWC issues its final advisory on Tropical Disturbance 22W.

October 18

- 0000 UTC, (0800 UTC+8) – The JMA reports that a tropical depression has formed about 1935 km (1200 mi) to the southeast of Hagåtña, Guam.
- 0000 UTC, (0800 UTC+8) – The CMA starts to monitor the tropical depression.
- 0300 UTC, (1100 UTC+8) – The JTWC designates the tropical depression as Tropical Depression 23W.
- 1800 UTC, (0200 UTC+8, October 19) – The JTWC reports that Tropical Depression 23W has intensified into a tropical storm.

October 19

- 0600 UTC, (1400 UTC+8) – The JMA reports that Tropical Depression 23W has intensified into a tropical storm and names it Bavi.
- 0600 UTC, (1400 UTC+8) – The CMA reports that Tropical Depression Bavi, (23W), has intensified into a tropical storm.
- 1200 UTC, (2000 UTC+8) – The JTWC reports that Tropical Storm Bavi, (23W), has reached its one-minute sustained peak windspeeds of 85 km/h, (50 mph).
- 1800 UTC, (0200 UTC+8, October 20) – The JMA reports that Tropical Storm Bavi, (23W), has reached its ten-minute sustained peak windspeeds of 85 km/h, (50 mph).
- 1800 UTC, (0200 UTC+8, October 20) – The CMA reports that Tropical Storm Bavi, (23W), has reached its two-minute sustained peak windspeeds of 85 km/h, (50 mph).

October 20

- 0600 UTC, (1400 UTC+8) – The JTWC issues its final advisory on Tropical Storm Bavi, (23W), has weakened into an extratropical storm.
- 1200 UTC, (2000 UTC+8) – The JMA reports that Tropical Storm Bavi, (23W), has weakened into an extratropical storm.
- 1200 UTC, (2000 UTC+8) – The CMA reports that Tropical Storm Bavi, (23W), has weakened into an extratropical storm.

October 21

- 0600 UTC, (1400 UTC+8) – The CMA issues its final advisory on the Extratropical Storm Bavi (23W).

October 22

- 1200 UTC, (2000 UTC+8) – The JMA issues its final advisory on the Extratropical Storm Bavi, (23W), as it moves out of the Western Pacific.

=== November ===
November 5

- 1200 UTC, (2000 UTC+8) – The JMA reports that a tropical depression has formed about 1000 km, (620 mi), to the southeast of Manila, Philippines.
- 1200 UTC, (2000 UTC+8) – The CMA starts to monitor the tropical depression.

November 6

- 0000 UTC, (0800 UTC+8) – PAGASA names the Tropical Depression as Quinta.
- 1800 UTC, (0200 UTC+8, November 7) – The JTWC designates Tropical Depression Quinta, as Tropical Depression 24W.

November 7

- 0000 UTC, (0800 UTC+8) – The JTWC reports that Tropical Depression 24W, (Quinta), has intensified into a tropical storm.
- 0600 UTC, (1400 UTC+8) – The JMA reports that Tropical Depression 24W, (Quinta), has intensified into a tropical storm and names it Maysak.
- 0600 UTC, (1400 UTC+8) – The CMA reports that Tropical Depression Maysak, (24W, Quinta), has intensified into a tropical storm.
- 2100 UTC, (0500 UTC+8, November 10) – PAGASA reports that Tropical Depression Rolly has developed about 120 km (75 mi) to the east of Northern Mindanao, Philippines.

November 8

- 0300 UTC, (1100 UTC+8) – PAGASA issues its final advisory on Tropical Storm Maysak, (24W, Quinta), as it moves out of its area of responsibility.
- 1200 UTC, (2000 UTC+8) – The JTWC reports that Tropical Storm Maysak, (24W, Quinta), has reached its one-minute sustained peak windspeeds of 90 km/h, (60 mph).
- 1200 UTC, (2000 UTC+8) – The JMA reports that Tropical Storm Maysak, (24W, Quinta), has intensified into a severe tropical storm.
- 1200 UTC, (2000 UTC+8) – The JMA reports that Severe Tropical Storm Maysak, (24W, Quinta), has reached its peak ten-minute sustained peak windspeeds of 90 km/h, (60 mph).
- 1200 UTC, (2000 UTC+8) – The CMA reports that Tropical Storm Maysak, (24W, Quinta), has intensified into a severe tropical storm.
- 1200 UTC, (2000 UTC+8) – The CMA reports that Severe Tropical Storm Maysak, (24W, Quinta), has reached its peak two-minute sustained peak windspeeds of 90 km/h, (60 mph).

November 9

- 0300 UTC, (1100 UTC+8) – PAGASA issues its final advisory on Tropical Depression Rolly as it weakens into an area of low pressure.
- 0600 UTC, (1400 UTC+8) – The CMA reports that Severe Tropical Storm Maysak, (24W, Quinta), has weakened into a tropical storm.
- 0600 UTC, (1400 UTC+8) – The JMA reports that Severe Tropical Storm Maysak, (24W, Quinta), has weakened into a tropical storm.
- 1200 UTC, (2000 UTC+8) – The JMA reports that Tropical Storm Maysak, (24W, Quinta), has weakened into a tropical depression.
- 1800 UTC, (0200 UTC+8, November 10) – The JTWC reports that Tropical Storm Maysak, (24W, Quinta), has weakened into a tropical depression.
- 2100 UTC, (0500 UTC+8, November 10) – PAGASA reports that Tropical Storm Maysak, (24W, Quinta), has moved back into its area of responsibility.

November 10

- 0000 UTC, (0800 UTC+8) – The JMA reports that a Tropical Depression has formed about 340 km, (210 mi), to the northeast of the Philippines.
- 0000 UTC, (0800 UTC+8) – The CMA reports that Tropical Storm Maysak, (24W, Quinta), has weakened into a tropical depression.
- 0600 UTC, (1400 UTC+8) – The JTWC reports that Tropical Depression Maysak, (24W, Quinta), has weakened into a tropical disturbance.

November 11

- 1500 UTC, (2300 UTC+8) – PAGASA issues its final advisory on Tropical Storm Maysak, (24W, Quinta), as it moves back into its area of responsibility.

November 12

- 0600 UTC, (1400 UTC+8) – The JTWC reports that Tropical Disturbance Maysak, (24W, Quinta), has re-intensified into a tropical depression.
- 0900 UTC, (1700 UTC+8) – PAGASA re-initiates advisories on Tropical Depression Maysak, (24W, Quinta), as it moves back into its area of responsibility and renames it Siony.
- 1800 UTC, (0200 UTC+8, November 13) – The JMA issues its final advisory on the tropical depression as it weakens into a low-pressure area.

November 13

- 0600 UTC, (1400 UTC+8) – The JTWC reports that Tropical Depression Maysak, (24W, Quinta, Siony), has weakened into a tropical disturbance.
- 0900 UTC, (1700 UTC+8) – PAGASA issues its final advisory on Tropical Depression Maysak, (24W, Quinta, Siony), as it moves out of its area of responsibility for the final time.
- 1200 UTC, (2000 UTC+8) – The JTWC issues its final advisory on Tropical Depression Maysak, (24W, Quinta, Siony).
- 1500 UTC, (2300 UTC+8) – PAGASA reports that Tropical Depression Tonyo, has developed about 500 km, (310 mi), to the east of Mindanao.
- 1800 UTC, (0200 UTC+8, November 14) – The CMA issues its final advisory on Tropical Depression Maysak, (24W, Quinta, Siony).
- 1800 UTC, (0200 UTC+8, November 14) – The JMA issues its final advisory on Tropical Depression Maysak, (24W, Quinta, Siony).

November 14

- 1200 UTC, (2000 UTC+8) – Tropical Depression Tonyo, makes landfall on Mindanao in the Philippines.
- 1800 UTC, (0200 UTC+8, November 15) – The JMA reports that a tropical depression has formed about 1560 km, (970 mi), to the southeast of Tokyo, Japan.
- 1800 UTC, (0200 UTC+8, November 15) – The JMA starts to monitor Tropical Depression Tonyo, as a tropical depression.
- 1800 UTC, (0200 UTC+8, November 15) – The CMA starts to monitor the tropical depression, previously located to the southeast of Tokyo, Japan, as a tropical depression.
- 1800 UTC, (0200 UTC+8, November 15) – The CMA starts to monitor Tropical Depression Tonyo as a tropical depression.

November 15

- 0600 UTC, (1400 UTC+8) – The JTWC designates the tropical depression to the southeast of Tokyo, Japan, as Tropical Depression 25W.
- 1500 UTC, (2300 UTC+8) – PAGASA issues its final advisory on Tropical Depression Tonyo, as it moves out of its area of responsibility.
- 1800 UTC, (0200 UTC+8, November 16) – The JMA reports that Tropical Depression 25W has intensified into a tropical storm and names it Haishen.
- 1800 UTC, (0200 UTC+8, November 16) – The JTWC designates Tropical Depression Tonyo, as 26W.
- 1800 UTC, (0200 UTC+8, November 16) – The CMA reports that Tropical Depression Haishen, (25W), has intensified into a tropical storm.

November 16

- 0000 UTC, (0800 UTC+8) – The JMA reports that Tropical Storm Haishen, (25W), has reached its peak ten-minute sustained windspeeds of 75 km/h, (45 mph).
- 0000 UTC, (0800 UTC+8) – The JTWC reports that Tropical Storm Haishen, (25W), has intensified into a tropical storm.
- 0000 UTC, (0800 UTC+8) – The CMA reports that Tropical Storm Haishen, (25W), has reached its peak two-minute sustained windspeeds of 75 km/h, (45 mph).
- 0600 UTC, (1400 UTC+8) – The JMA names Tropical Depression 26W, (Tonyo), as Noul.
- 0600 UTC, (1400 UTC+8) – The JTWC reports that Tropical Storm Haishen, (25W), has reached its peak one-minute sustained windspeeds of 75 km/h, (45 mph).
- 0600 UTC, (1400 UTC+8) – The JTWC reports that Tropical Depression Noul, (26W, Tonyo), has intensified into a tropical storm.
- 0600 UTC, (1400 UTC+8) – The CMA reports that Tropical Depression Noul, (26W, Tonyo), has intensified into a tropical storm.
- 1200 UTC, (2000 UTC+8) – The JMA reports that Tropical Depression Noul, (26W, Tonyo), has intensified into a tropical storm.
- 1800 UTC, (0200 UTC+8, November 17) – The JTWC reports that Tropical Storm Haishen, (25W), has weakened into an extratropical cyclone.

November 17

- 0000 UTC, (0800 UTC+8) – The JMA reports that Tropical Storm Noul, (26W, Tonyo), has reached its peak ten-minute windspeeds of 85 km/h, (50 mph).
- 0000 UTC, (0800 UTC+8) – The JTWC issues its final advisory on Extratropical Storm Haishen, (25W).
- 0000 UTC, (0800 UTC+8) – The JTWC reports that Tropical Storm Noul, (26W, Tonyo), has reached its peak one-minute windspeeds of 85 km/h, (50 mph).
- 0000 UTC, (0800 UTC+8) – The CMA reports that Tropical Storm Noul, (26W, Tonyo), has reached its peak two-minute windspeeds of 85 km/h, (50 mph).
- 0600 UTC, (1400 UTC+8) – Tropical Storm Noul, (26W, Tonyo), makes landfall on Ninh Thuan province in Vietnam.
- 0600 UTC, (1400 UTC+8) – The CMA reports that Tropical Storm Haishen, (25W), has weakened into a tropical depression.
- 1200 UTC, (2000 UTC+8) – The JMA reports that Tropical Storm Haishen, (25W), has weakened into an extratropical storm.
- 1200 UTC, (2000 UTC+8) – The CMA reports that Tropical Storm Haishen, (25W), has weakened into an extratropical storm.
- 1200 UTC, (2000 UTC+8) – The JMA reports that Tropical Storm Noul, (26W, Tonyo), has weakened into a tropical depression.
- 1200 UTC, (2000 UTC+8) – The JTWC reports that Tropical Storm Noul, (26W, Tonyo), has weakened into a tropical depression.
- 1200 UTC, (2000 UTC+8) – The JTWC issues its final advisory on Tropical Depression Noul, (26W, Tonyo).
- 1200 UTC, (2000 UTC+8) – The CMA reports that Tropical Storm Noul, (26W, Tonyo), has weakened into a tropical depression.
- 1800 UTC, (0200 UTC+8, November 18) – The JMA report that Tropical Depression Noul, (26W, Tonyo), has dissipated.
- 1800 UTC, (0200 UTC+8, November 18) – The CMA issues its final advisory on Tropical Depression Noul, (26W, Tonyo).

November 18

- 0600 UTC, (1400 UTC+8) – The CMA issues its final advisory on Extratropical storm Haishen, (25W).

November 19

- 0000 UTC, (0800 UTC+8) – The JMA issues its final advisory on Extratropical storm Haishen, (25W), as it moves out of Western Pacific.

=== December ===
December 2

- 0000 UTC, (0800 UTC+8) – The JMA reports that a tropical depression has formed about 400 km, (250 mi), to the northwest of Bandar Seri Begawan in Brunei.
- 1800 UTC, (0200 UTC+8, December 3) – The JMA issues their final warning on the tropical depression to the north of Brunei.

December 8

- 0000 UTC, (0800 UTC+8) – The JMA reports that a tropical depression has formed about 500 km, (310 mi), to the northwest of Kwajalein Atoll in the Marshall Islands.

December 9

- 0000 UTC, (0800 UTC+8) – The JMA reports that the tropical depression, has weakened into an area of low pressure.

December 10

- 1200 UTC, (2000 UTC+8) – The JTWC reports that the low pressure area has intensified into a tropical depression and designates it as 27W.

December 11

- 0000 UTC, (0800 UTC+8) – The CMA starts to monitor Tropical Depression 27W.
- 0600 UTC, (1400 UTC+8) – The JMA reports that Tropical Depression 27W has re-intensified into a tropical depression.
- 1800 UTC, (0200 UTC+8, December 12) – The JTWC reports that Tropical Depression 27W, has intensified into a tropical storm.

December 12

- 1200 UTC, (2000 UTC+8) – The CMA reports that Tropical Depression 27W, has intensified into a tropical storm.
- 1800 UTC, (0200 UTC+8, December 13) – The JMA reports that Tropical Depression 27W, has intensified into a tropical storm and names it Dolphin.

December 13

- 0900 UTC, (1700 UTC+8) – PAGASA reports that Tropical Storm Dolphin, (27W), has moved into its area of responsibility and names it Ulysses.

December 14

- 0000 UTC, (0800 UTC+8) – The CMA reports that Tropical Storm Dolphin, (27W, Ulysses), has intensified into a severe tropical storm.
- 1200 UTC, (2000 UTC+8) – The JMA reports that Tropical Storm Dolphin, (27W, Ulysses), has intensified into a severe tropical storm.

December 15

- 0000 UTC, (0800 UTC+8) – The JTWC reports that Tropical Storm Dolphin, (27W, Ulysses), has intensified into a category one typhoon.
- 1200 UTC, (2000 UTC+8) – The CMA reports that Severe Tropical Storm Dolphin, (27W, Ulysses), has intensified into a typhoon.
- 1800 UTC, (0200 UTC+8, December 16) – The JMA reports that Severe Tropical Storm Dolphin, (27W, Ulysses), has intensified into a typhoon.
- 1800 UTC, (0200 UTC+8, December 16) – The JMA reports that Typhoon Dolphin, (27W, Ulysses), has reached its ten-minute sustained peak windspeeds of 130 km/h (75 mph).
- 1800 UTC, (0200 UTC+8, December 16) – The JTWC reports that Typhoon Dolphin, (27W, Ulysses), has intensified into a category two typhoon.
- 1800 UTC, (0200 UTC+8, December 16) – The JTWC reports that Typhoon Dolphin, (27W, Ulysses), has reached its one-minute sustained peak windspeeds of 155 km/h (100 mph).
- 1800 UTC, (0200 UTC+8, December 16) – The CMA reports that Typhoon Dolphin, (27W, Ulysses), has reached its peak two-minute sustained wind speeds of 130 km/h, (80 mph).

December 16

- 1200 UTC, (2000 UTC+8) – The JMA reports that Typhoon Dolphin (Ulysses) has weakened into a severe tropical storm.
- 1200 UTC, (2000 UTC+8) – The CMA reports that Typhoon Dolphin, (27W, Ulysses), has weakened into a severe tropical storm.

December 17

- 0600 UTC, (1400 UTC+8) – The JMA reports that Severe Tropical Storm Dolphin, (27W, Ulysses), has weakened into a tropical storm.
- 0600 UTC, (1400 UTC+8) – The JTWC reports that Typhoon Dolphin, (27W, Ulysses), has weakened into a tropical storm.
- 1200 UTC, (2000 UTC+8) – The CMA reports that Severe Tropical Storm Dolphin, (27W, Ulysses), has weakened into a tropical storm.
- 1500 UTC, (2300 UTC+8) — PAGASA issues its final advisory on Severe Tropical Storm Dolphin, (27W, Ulysses), as it moves out of their area of responsibility.

December 18

- 0600 UTC, (1400 UTC+8) – The JTWC reports that Tropical Storm Dolphin, (27W, Ulysses), has weakened into a tropical depression.
- 0600 UTC, (1400 UTC+8) – The JTWC issues its final advisory on Tropical Depression Dolphin, (27W, Ulysses).
- 0600 UTC, (1400 UTC+8) – The CMA reports that Tropical Storm Dolphin, (27W, Ulysses), has weakened into a tropical depression.
- 1200 UTC, (2000 UTC+8) – The JMA reports that Tropical Storm Dolphin, (27W, Ulysses), has weakened into an extratropical low.
- 1200 UTC, (2000 UTC+8) – The CMA reports that Tropical Depression Dolphin, (27W, Ulysses), has weakened into an extratropical cyclone.

December 19

- 0000 UTC, (0800 UTC+8) – The JMA issues their final advisory on the extratropical low Dolphin.

December 30

- 1500 UTC - A tropical disturbance forms east of Mindanao, Philippines. The system intensified into the first tropical depression of the 2009 Pacific typhoon season on January 3, 2009.

December 31

- 2359 UTC - The 2008 Pacific typhoon season officially ends as the 2009 Pacific typhoon season officially starts.

== See also ==
- 2008 Pacific typhoon season
- Pacific typhoon season
- Timeline of the 2008 Atlantic hurricane season
- Timeline of the 2008 Pacific hurricane season
- Timeline of the 2008 North Indian Ocean cyclone season
- Timeline of the 2007–08 South-West Indian Ocean cyclone season
- Timeline of the 2007–08 South Pacific cyclone season
- Timeline of the 2007–08 Australian region cyclone season
