= List of storms named Neoguri =

The name Neoguri (Korean: 너구리, [nʌ̹ɡuɾi]) has been used for five tropical cyclones in the western North Pacific Ocean. The variant Noguri was used in 2002 before the spelling was corrected by the ESCAP/WMO Typhoon Committee. The name was contributed by South Korea and means raccoon dog (Nyctereutes procyonoides) in Korean.

- Severe Tropical Storm Noguri (2002) (T0204, 07W, Espada) – a Category 2-equivalent typhoon that approached Japan.
- Typhoon Neoguri (2008) (T0801, 02W, Ambo) – a rare April major typhoon that struck China.
- Typhoon Neoguri (2014) (T1408, 08W, Florita) – a Category 5 storm that eventually made landfall in Japan and Korea.
- Typhoon Neoguri (2019) (T1920, 21W, Perla) – passed close to Japan.
- Typhoon Neoguri (2025) (T2519, 25W) – long-lived, erratic and strong Category 4-equivalent typhoon that churned in the open ocean.

| Preceded by Ragasa | Pacific typhoon season names Neoguri | Succeeded by Bualoi |
