= 1972 Pacific typhoon season =

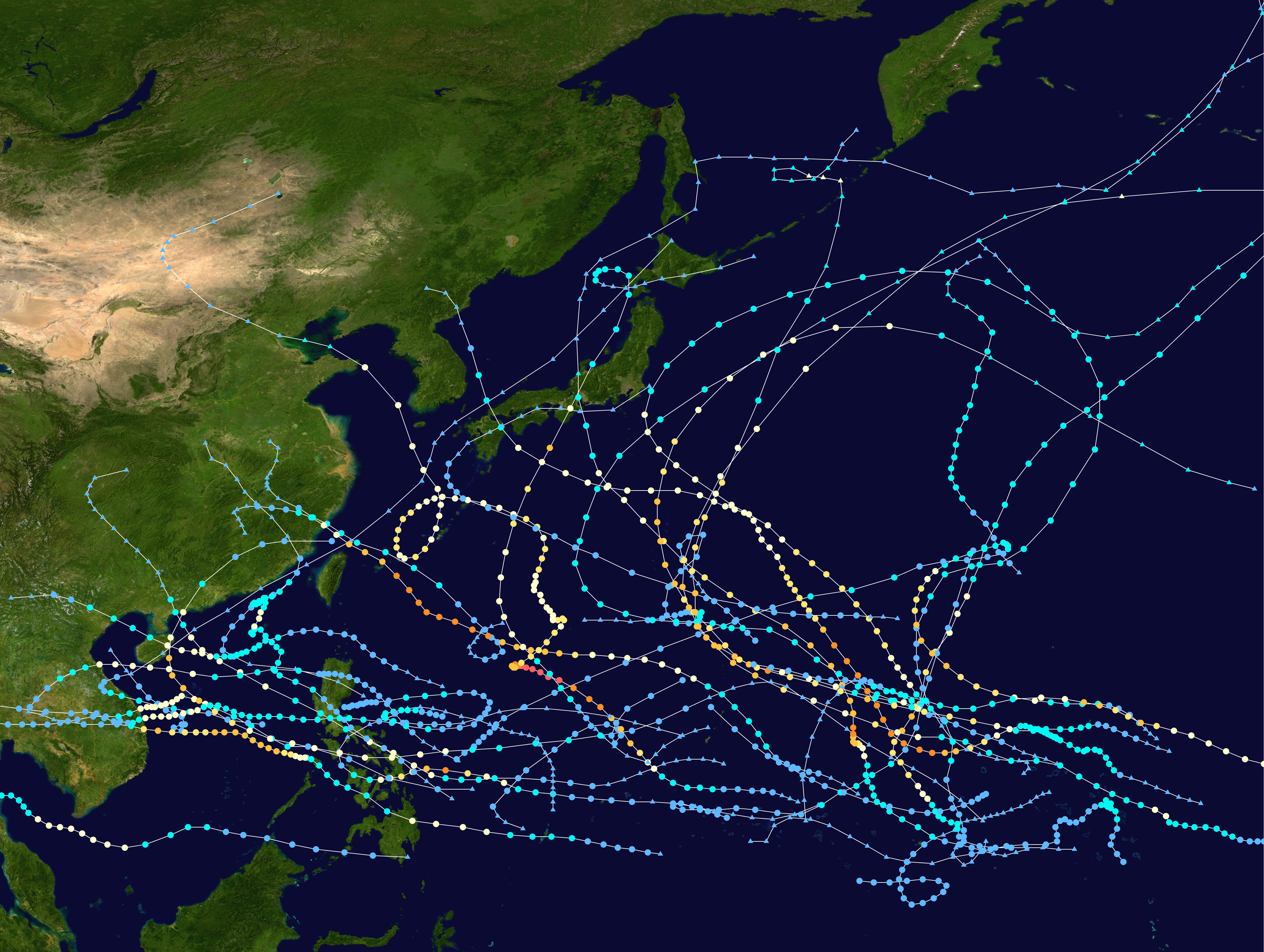
- Season summary map

Seasonal boundaries
- First system formed: January 4, 1972
- Last system dissipated: December 21, 1972

Strongest storm
- Name: Rita
  - Maximum winds: 270 km/h (165 mph) (1-minute sustained)
  - Lowest pressure: 910 hPa (mbar)

Seasonal statistics
- Total depressions: 63
- Total storms: 31
- Typhoons: 24
- Very strong typhoons: 2 (unofficial)
- Total fatalities: > 1,169
- Total damage: > $585 million (1972 USD)

Related articles
- 1972 Atlantic hurricane season; 1972 Pacific hurricane season; 1972 North Indian Ocean cyclone season

The 1972 Pacific typhoon season was an extremely active season, producing 31 tropical storms, 24 typhoons and 2 intense typhoons. It has no official bounds; it ran year-round in 1972, but most tropical cyclones tend to form in the northwestern Pacific Ocean between June and December. These dates conventionally delimit the period of each year when most tropical cyclones form in the northwestern Pacific Ocean.

The scope of this article is limited to the Pacific Ocean, north of the equator and west of the International Date Line. Storms that form east of the date line and north of the equator are called hurricanes (see 1972 Pacific hurricane season). Tropical storms formed in the entire west Pacific basin were assigned a name by the Joint Typhoon Warning Center. Tropical depressions in this basin have the "W" suffix added to their number. Tropical depressions that enter or form in the Philippine area of responsibility are assigned a name by PAGASA (the Philippine Atmospheric, Geophysical and Astronomical Services Administration). This can often result in the same storm having two names.

== Systems ==
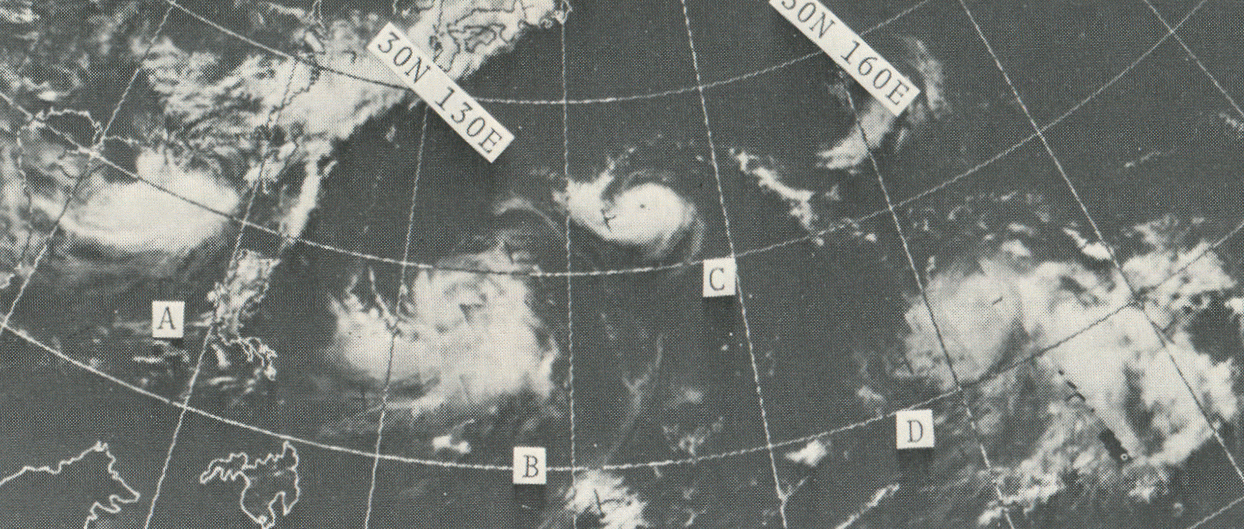
This ESSA 9 weather satellite mosaic image captures Tropical Cyclones Susan (A), Rita (B), Phyllis (C), and Tess (D) across the northwest Pacific Ocean on July 13, 1972

A total of 36 tropical depressions formed this year in the Western Pacific, of which 30 became tropical storms. Twenty-two storms reached typhoon intensity, of which two reached super typhoon strength.

=== Typhoon Kit (Asiang–Biring) ===
- Typhoon (JMA)
- Category 4-equivalent typhoon (SSHWS)
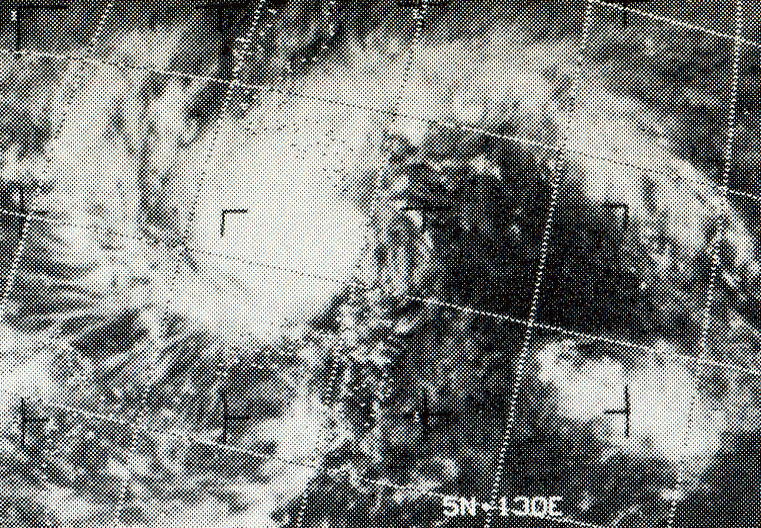
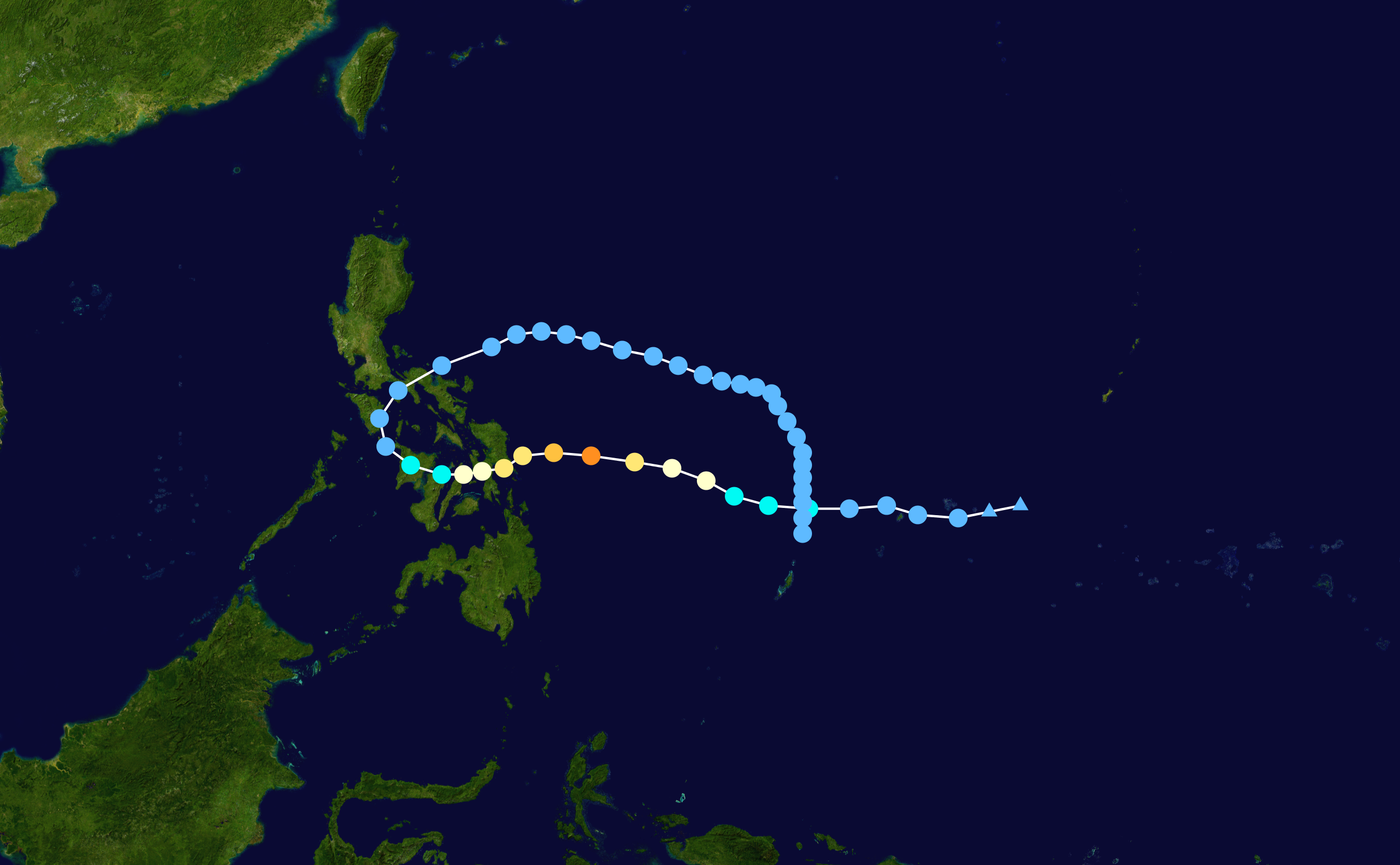
- Duration: January 4 – January 11
- Peak intensity: 220 km/h (140 mph) (1-min); 940 hPa (mbar)

A tropical disturbance generated by an upper tropospheric low in the mid-Pacific trough moved westward through the Caroline Islands, slowly organizing into Tropical Depression 1W on January 5. The depression quickly strengthened, reaching tropical storm status later that day and becoming a typhoon on the 6th as it neared the Philippines. Kit rapidly intensified on the 6th and 7th to a 140 mph (230 km/h) typhoon, the strongest ever in January, but its inflow was cut off to the west, weakening the typhoon as it continued westward. Kit hit the eastern Philippines as a 100 mph (200 km/h) typhoon on January 7, and turned north through the archipelago in response to a break in the subtropical ridge. This brought Kit eastward then southward, where after completing its large loop it dissipated on January 15, just 170 nautical miles (310 km) from its starting location.

This unusual, unexpected, and unseasonably strong typhoon killed 204 people and caused nearly $23 million in damage (1972 USD) in the Philippines. The destruction was mostly due to rains and flooding.

=== Tropical Depression 02W ===
- Tropical depression (SSHWS)
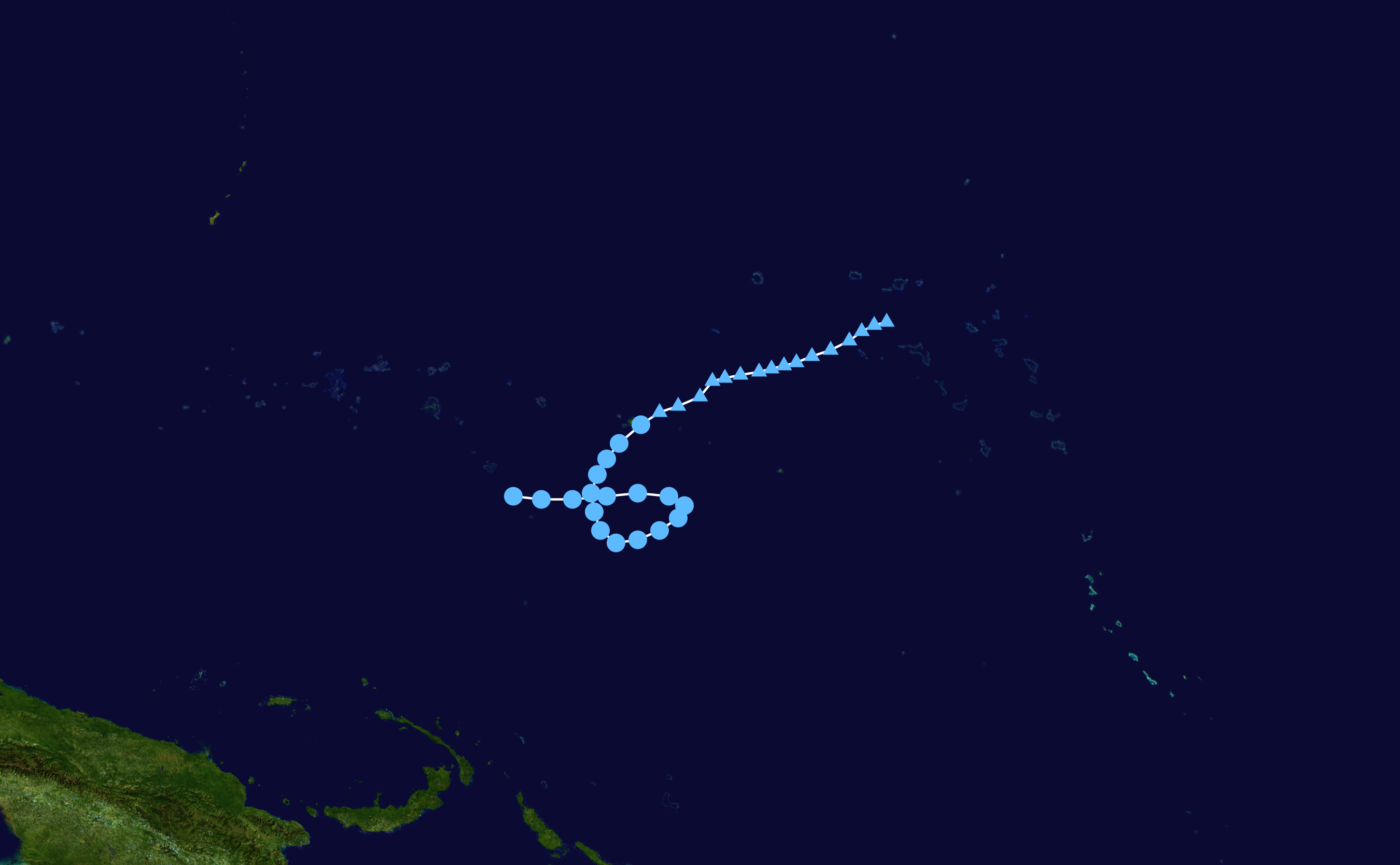
- Duration: April 2 – April 6
- Peak intensity: 55 km/h (35 mph) (1-min); 1004 hPa (mbar)

Tropical Depression 02W was a weak system that existed near the equator, doing a loop then traveling eastwards as a disturbance before dissipating.

=== Typhoon Lola ===
- Typhoon (JMA)
- Category 3-equivalent typhoon (SSHWS)
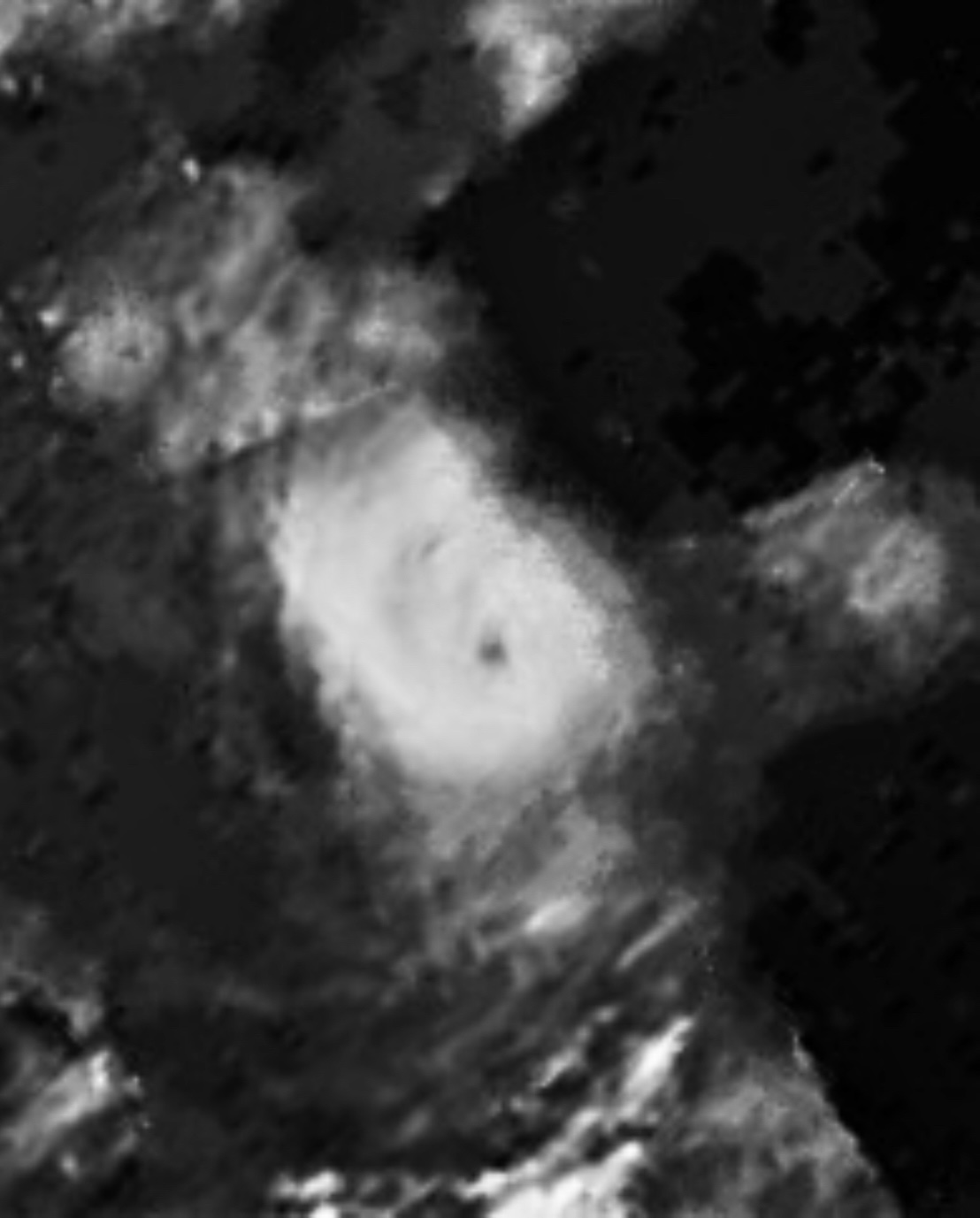
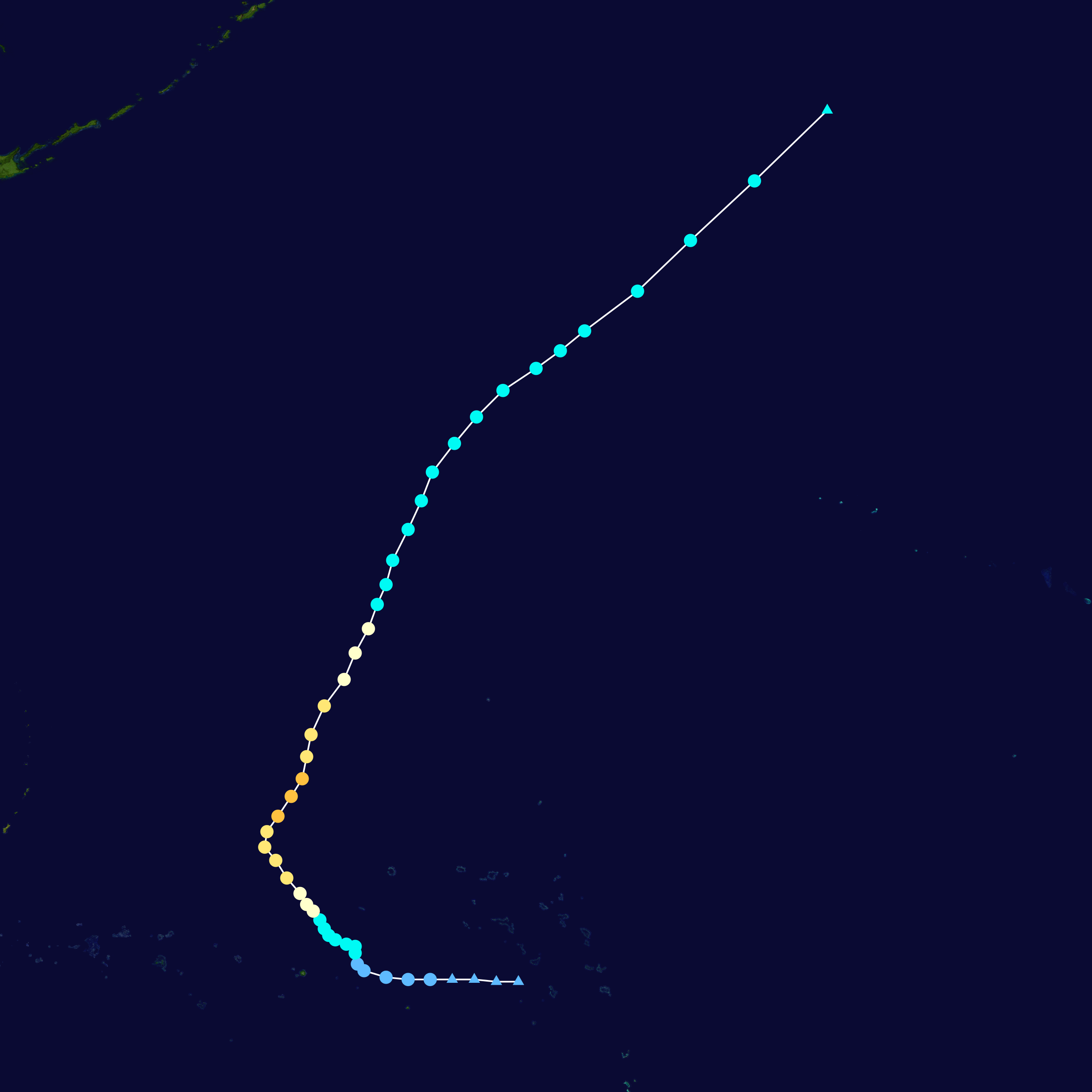
- Duration: May 27 – June 8
- Peak intensity: 195 km/h (120 mph) (1-min); 955 hPa (mbar)

The northern hemisphere part of a "cyclone twin" developed into a tropical depression west of Kwajalein on May 29. It headed west and slowly strengthened. As it turned to the northwest and then the north northeast, it reached its maximum intensity on June 5. It continued heading north northeast, steadily weakened, and went extratropical on June 7.

Lola passed close enough to some of the islands in Micronesia to cause damage. Two fishermen were reported missing. Wind and waves caused $18 thousand (1972 USD) in damage to Pohnpei and nearby atolls. They also destroyed the fresh water system, causing a shortage of drinking water. On Pingelap and Mokil, sixty houses were destroyed.

=== Tropical Storm Nina ===
- Tropical storm (JMA)
- Tropical storm (SSHWS)
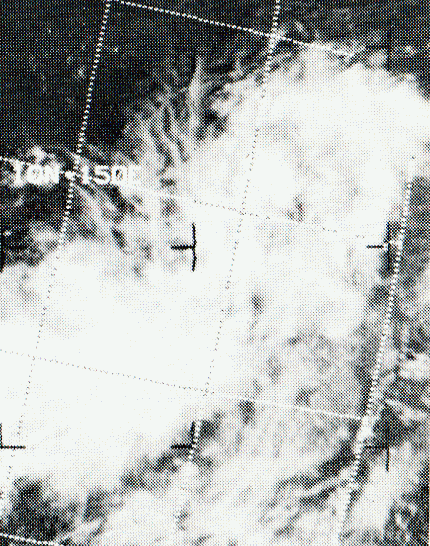
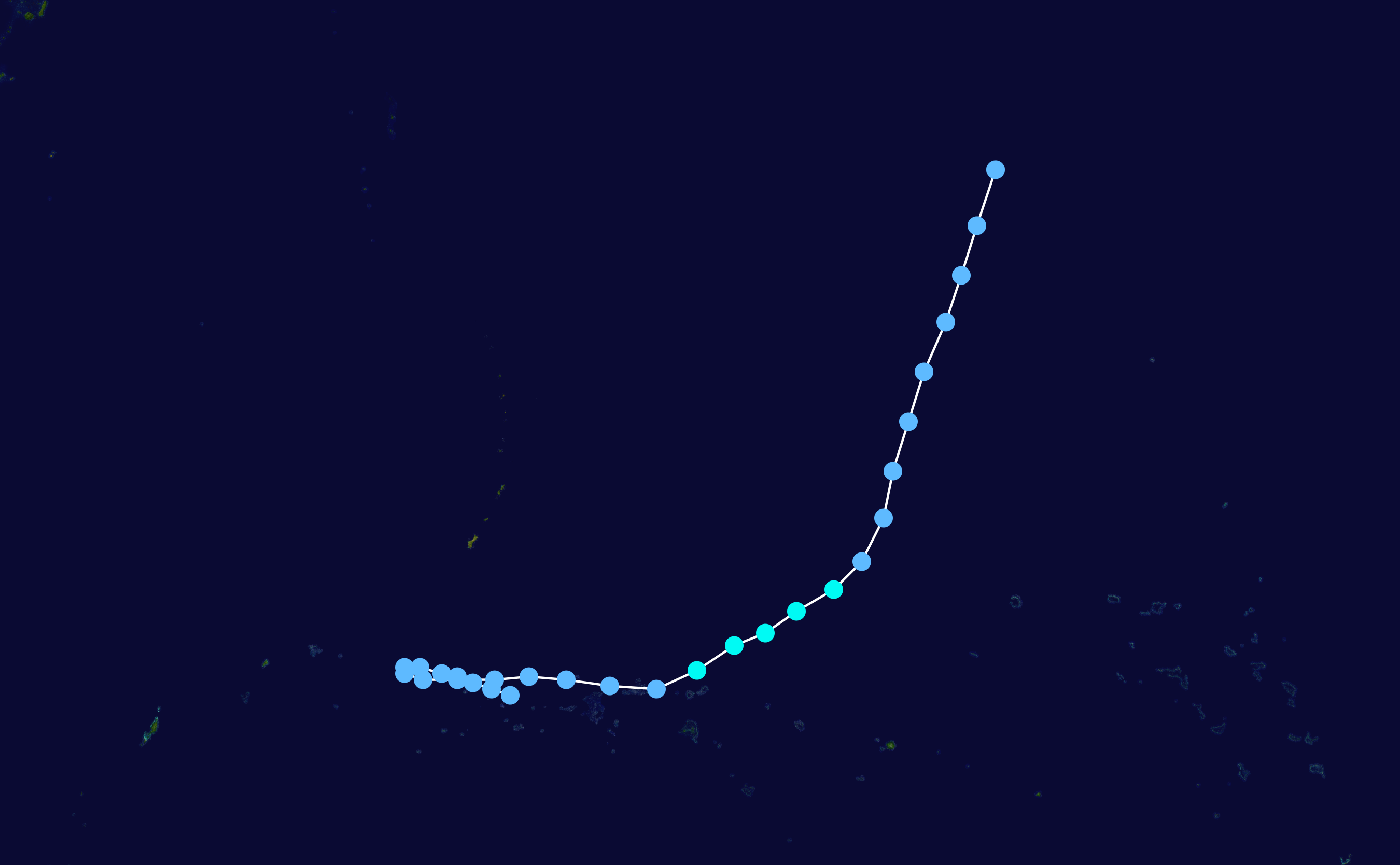
- Duration: June 1 – June 4
- Peak intensity: 95 km/h (60 mph) (1-min); 990 hPa (mbar)

Tropical Storm Nina formed as a disturbance heading westwards. It briefly became a tropical depression south of Guam, but it weakened back to a disturbance as it turned back eastwards. As it traveled eastwards, it reintensified, becoming a tropical storm late on the 3rd while far east-southeast of Guam. It did not last, though, weakening back to a disturbance on the 4th and dissipating on the 5th.

=== Tropical Storm Mamie ===
- Tropical storm (JMA)
- Tropical storm (SSHWS)
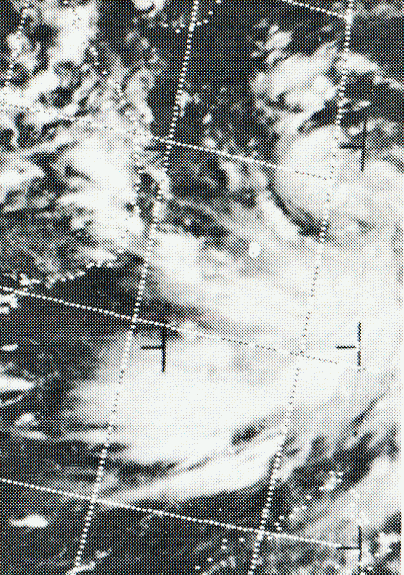
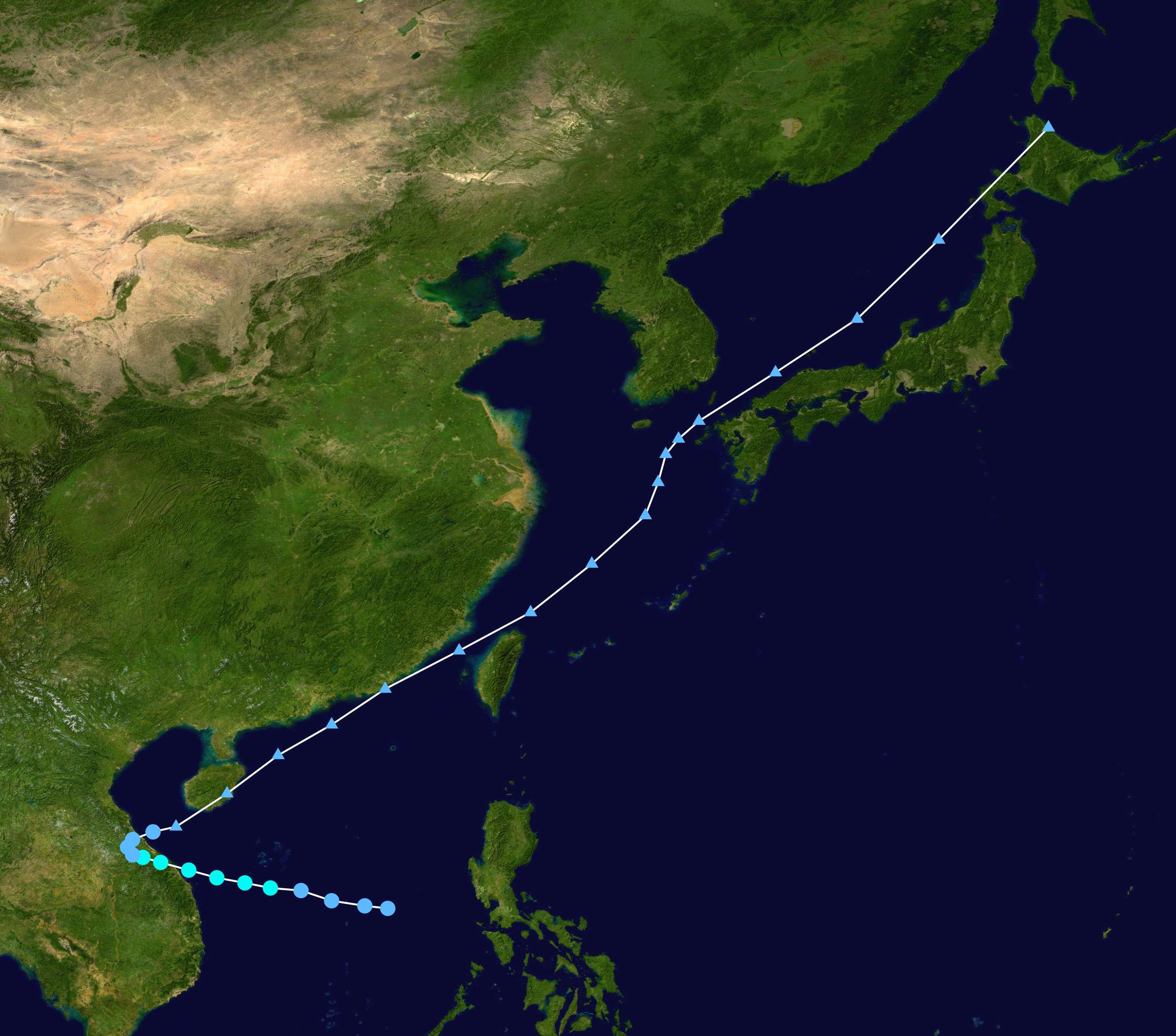
- Duration: June 1 – June 7
- Peak intensity: 85 km/h (50 mph) (1-min); 996 hPa (mbar)

Tropical Storm Mamie formed as a disturbance over the Philippines. It traveled westwards, becoming a tropical depression over the South China Sea, and then becoming a tropical storm on the 1st. The tropical storm made landfall in Vietnam late on the 3rd. It weakened to a tropical depression over land, and it became non-tropical as it went offshore. The extratropical remnants of Mamie traveled northeastwards along the Chinese coast, finally dissipating over Hokkaido.

=== Typhoon Ora (Konsing) ===
- Typhoon (JMA)
- Category 1-equivalent typhoon (SSHWS)
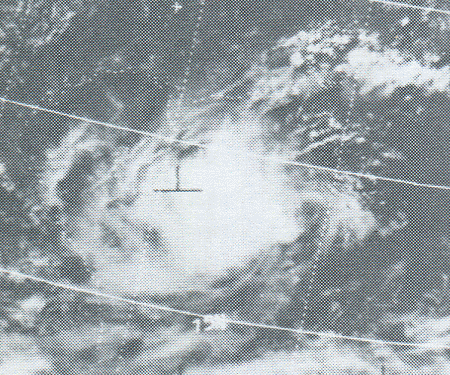
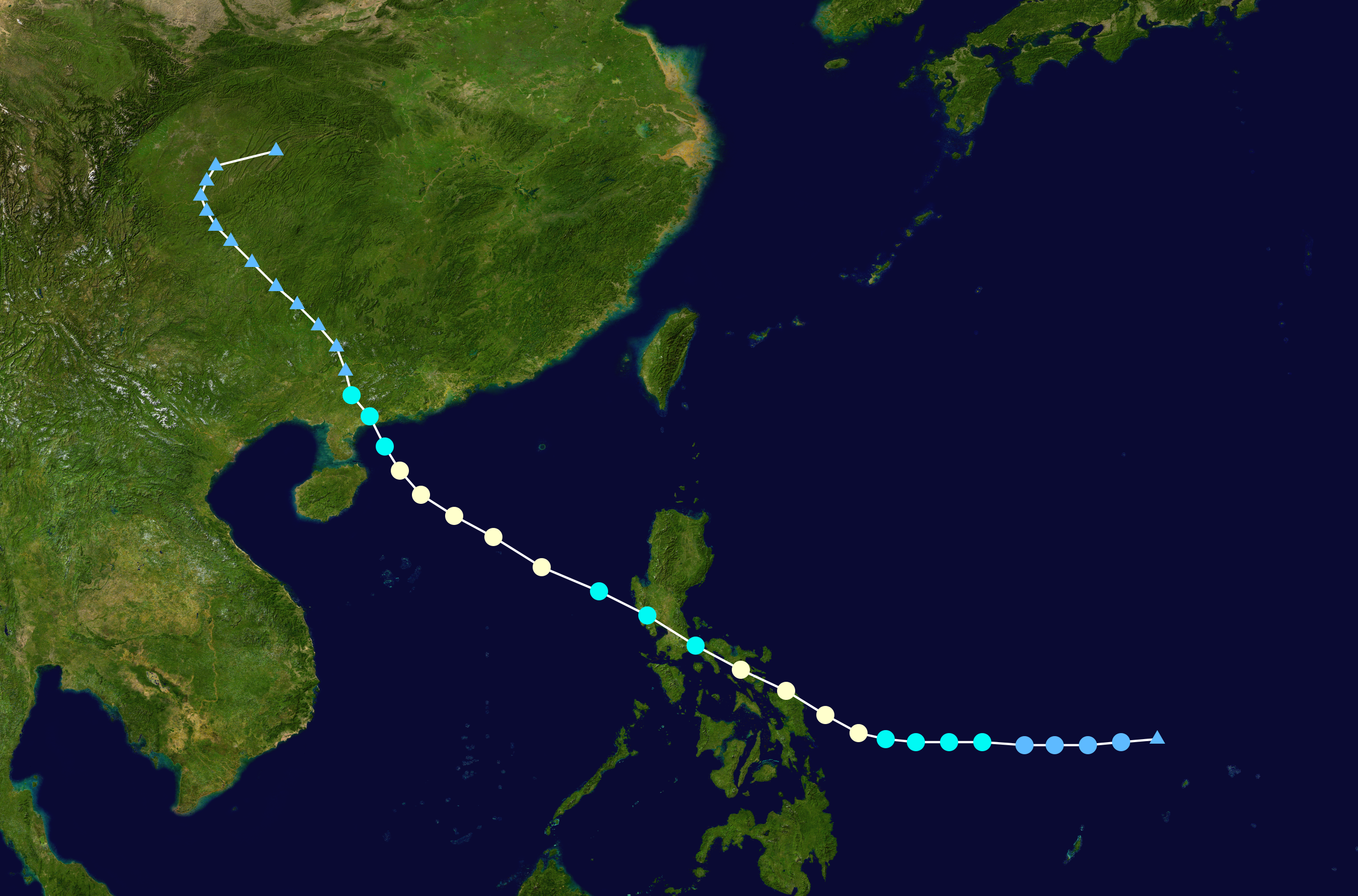
- Duration: June 22 – June 27
- Peak intensity: 150 km/h (90 mph) (1-min); 980 hPa (mbar)

Typhoon Ora, which formed on June 22, crossed the northern Philippines on the 24th and 25th as an 85 mph (137 km/h) typhoon. It weakened over land, but restrengthened in the South China Sea to a 90 mph (140 km/h) typhoon before hitting southern China on June 27. An unusual feature about Ora was while crossing the South China Sea, it never featured a wall cloud, even though it had winds of typhoon strength.

Ora caused heavy damage to the Manila area in the Philippines. It killed 131 people, including four who died when a ferry in the Bicol region capsized. In Manila Harbor, several ships were blown ashore. All in all, Ora left 385 thousand people homeless and caused $15 million (1972 USD) in damage.

=== Tropical Depression Didang ===
- Tropical depression (PAGASA)
- Duration: June 28 – June 30
- Peak intensity: 55 km/h (35 mph) (10-min);

=== Typhoon Phyllis ===
- Typhoon (JMA)
- Category 4-equivalent typhoon (SSHWS)
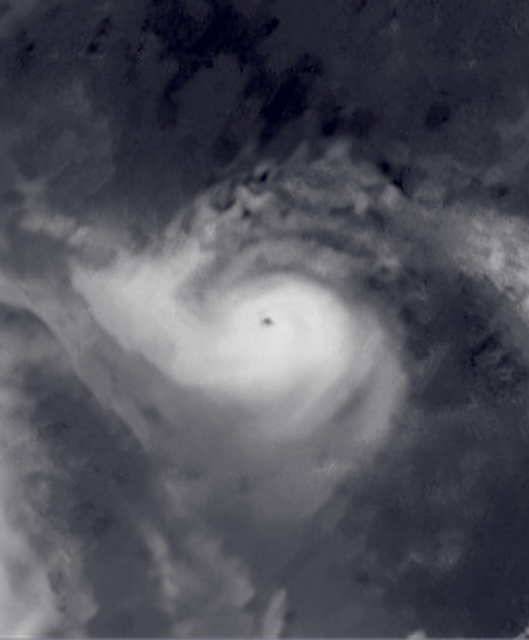
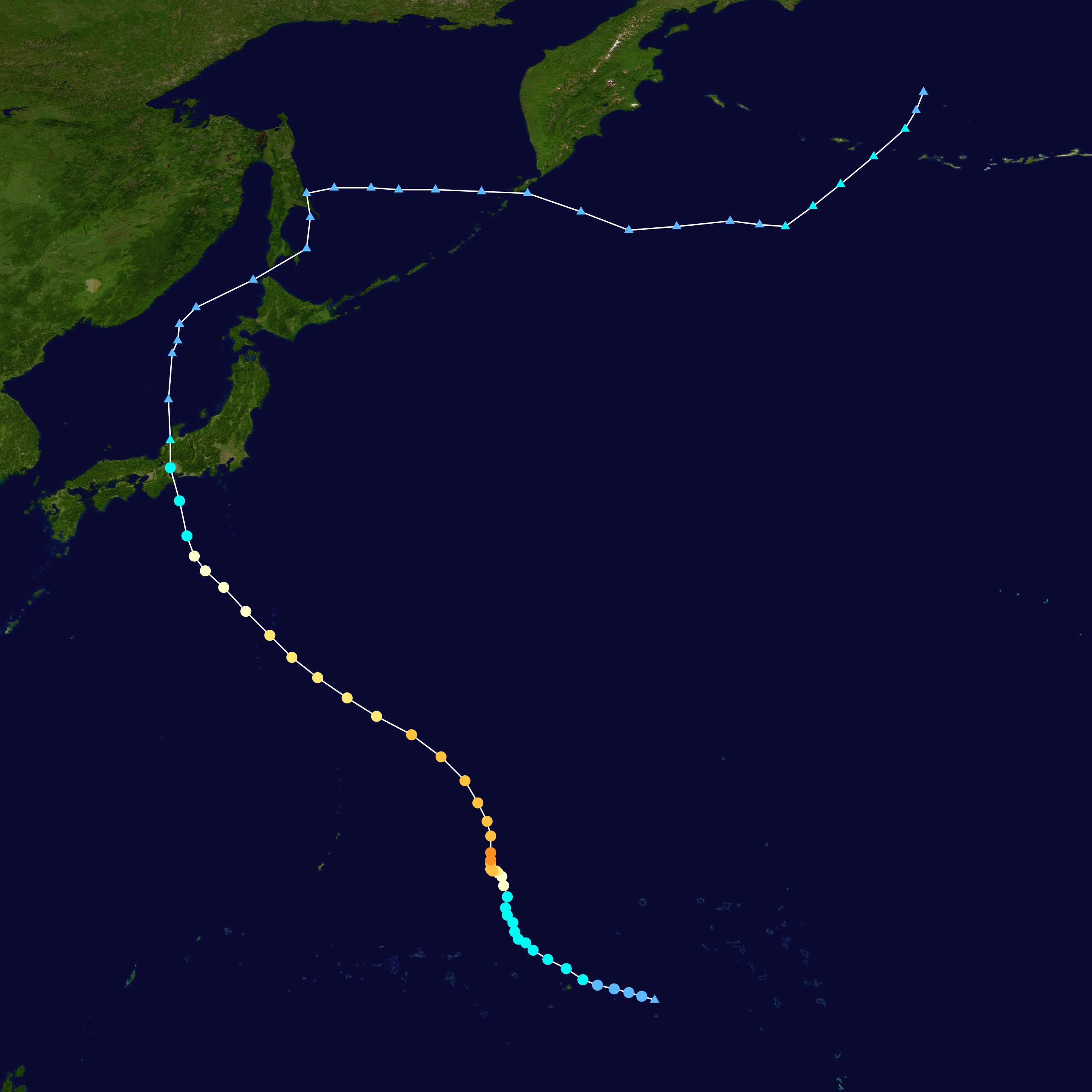
- Duration: July 4 – July 15
- Peak intensity: 220 km/h (140 mph) (1-min); 945 hPa (mbar)

Tropical Storm Phyllis, which formed on July 5, quickly intensified from late on July 9 to early July 11 to a 140 mph (230 km/h) typhoon. The typhoon turned to the northwest, steadily weakening as it approached Japan. Phyllis struck southeastern Japan on July 15 as a tropical storm, and became extratropical that night.

In Japan, Phyllis caused 3 deaths, more than 300 landslides, and flooded more than 6000 homes. Overall damage was moderate.

=== Typhoon Rita (Gloring) ===
- Typhoon (JMA)
- Category 5-equivalent super typhoon (SSHWS)
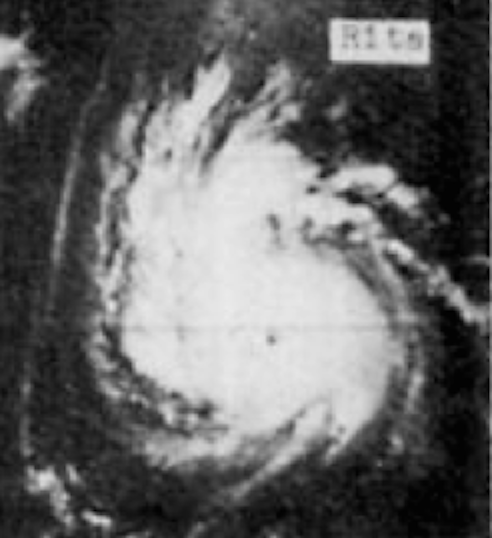
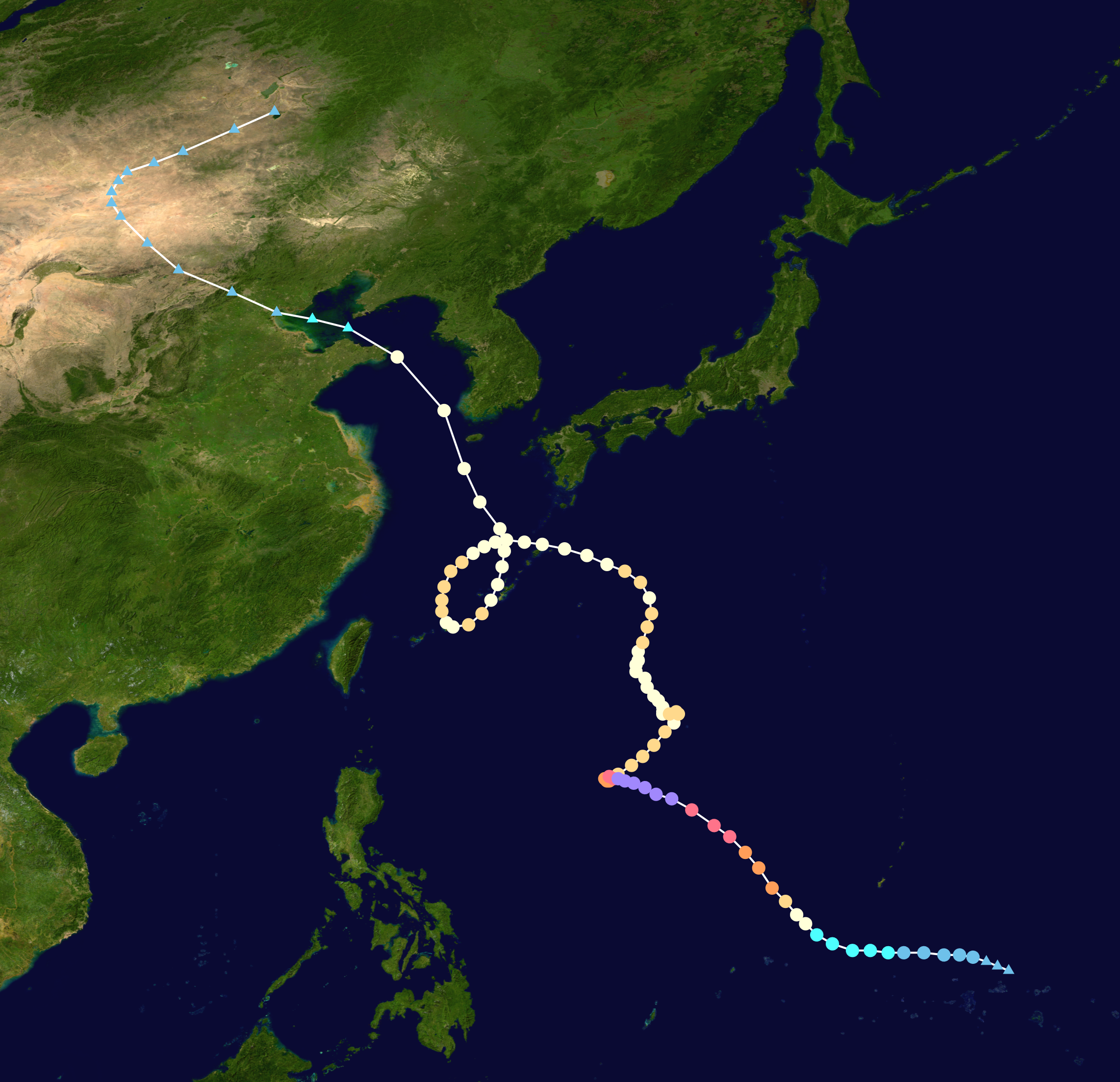
- Duration: July 5 – July 26
- Peak intensity: 270 km/h (165 mph) (1-min); 900 hPa (mbar)

The near-equatorial trough spawned four tropical cyclones on July 5, one of which would become Super Typhoon Rita. Having originated over the open Western Pacific, the depression tracked westward, becoming a tropical storm on July 7 and a typhoon the next day. Rita quickly intensified, reaching super typhoon strength on July 10 and a peak of 165 mph (266 km/h) on July 11. The typhoon stalled and weakened over the next two days as it headed to the northeast. On the July 15 and July 16, Rita again stalled, weakening down to 75 mph (121 km/h), as Tropical Storm Phyllis swung around its circulation and struck Japan. Rita then turned to the north, where it was able to restrengthen. Typhoon Tess at that time was just located some 800 nm east of Rita. A Fujiwhara interaction took place, forcing Rita executed a large loop from July 21 to July 25. In that loop the Rita caught USS Alamo and USS Juneau as they sought to evade to the south after dropping of US Marines and equipment in Okinawa. Both ships weathered the storm but Alamo sustained minor damage in the plunging seas. After looping and passing Okinawa, she continued to the northwest and began to accelerate as she entered a confluent zone created by a trough over Manchuria and a building ridge over the Sea of Japan. She passed by western South Korea, made landfall at Shidao port, Shandong and then weakened into a tropical storm. Rita entered the Bohai Sea, hit northeastern China, and dissipated over the Yanshan mountain northwest of Peking, China on the night of July 27.

Rita's large size and long life caused heavy rains throughout the areas it hit. Rita and Tropical Storm Susan's presence strengthened the southwest monsoon flow over Luzon, where torrential rains occurring between July 17 and July 21 lead to disastrous flooding which killed 214 and with over $150 million in damage. Near Guam, on July 8, the typhoon caused an Air Force Boeing B-52 to crash into the ocean, killing one member of its six-man crew. The remaining crew members were rescued by a US Navy nuclear attack submarine which surfaced in the roiling seas and literally fished the men out by using a line attached to a periscope and reeling them in as the boat rolled in the seas. In Taiwan, heavy rains caused landslides, one of which derailed a train, killing three. In Korea, eight people were killed, more fifty small vessels were lost, and more than two hundred buildings were destroyed. In the Ryukyu Islands, three people were killed. Crop damage was heavy, numerous boats were sunk, and several highways were blocked by mudslides.

Rita killed 229 people, making it this season's deadliest typhoon.

=== Typhoon Susan (Edeng) ===
- Typhoon (JMA)
- Category 1-equivalent typhoon (SSHWS)
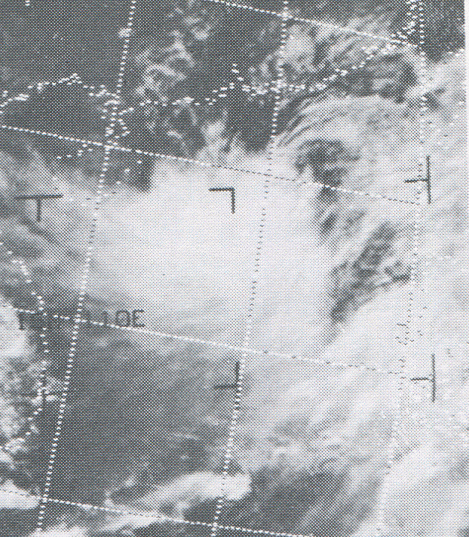
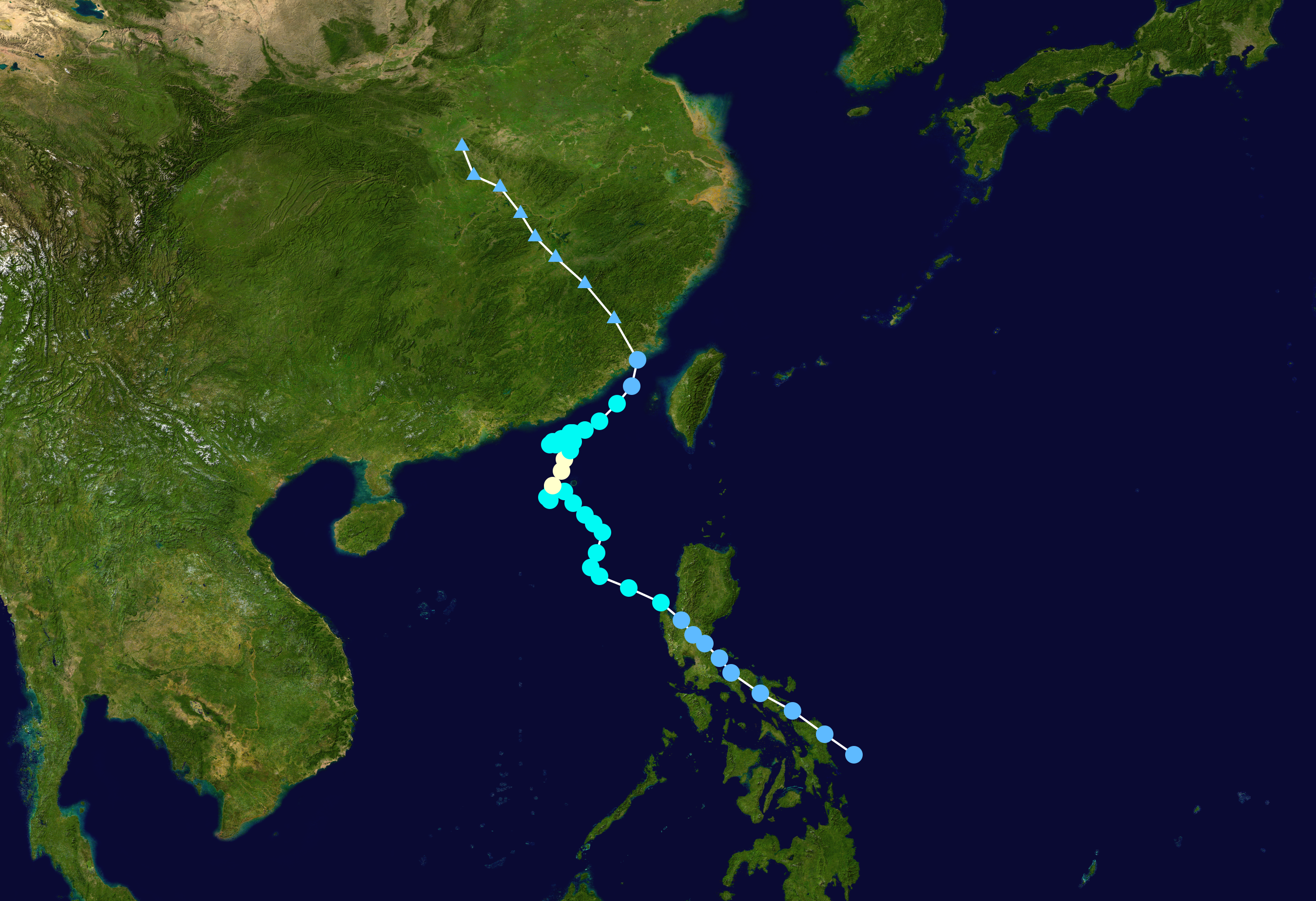
- Duration: July 5 – July 15
- Peak intensity: 120 km/h (75 mph) (1-min); 980 hPa (mbar)

A disturbance in the ITCZ became a tropical depression on July 5. It headed northwest over the Philippines. It intensified into a tropical storm almost immediately after entering the South China Sea on July 8. It then turned north, and erratically drifted and looped for four days. On July 11, Susan became a typhoon. On July 14, Susan moved close to the Taiwan Strait. It made landfall on the coast of Fujian province, and dissipated inland on July 15.

Susan caused heavy waves on the western coast of Luzon. Along with Super Typhoon Rita, Susan altered the monsoon winds over the Philippines, which caused flooding that killed 214 people; however, as Rita was primarily responsible for these conditions, the Joint Typhoon Warning Center attributes these deaths to the former system. By itself, Susan killed four people in Taiwan. Typhoon Susan sank the SS Oriental Falcon on 12 July 1972 after it ran aground in South China.

=== Typhoon Tess ===
- Typhoon (JMA)
- Category 4-equivalent typhoon (SSHWS)
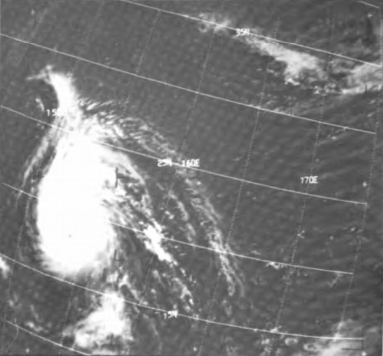
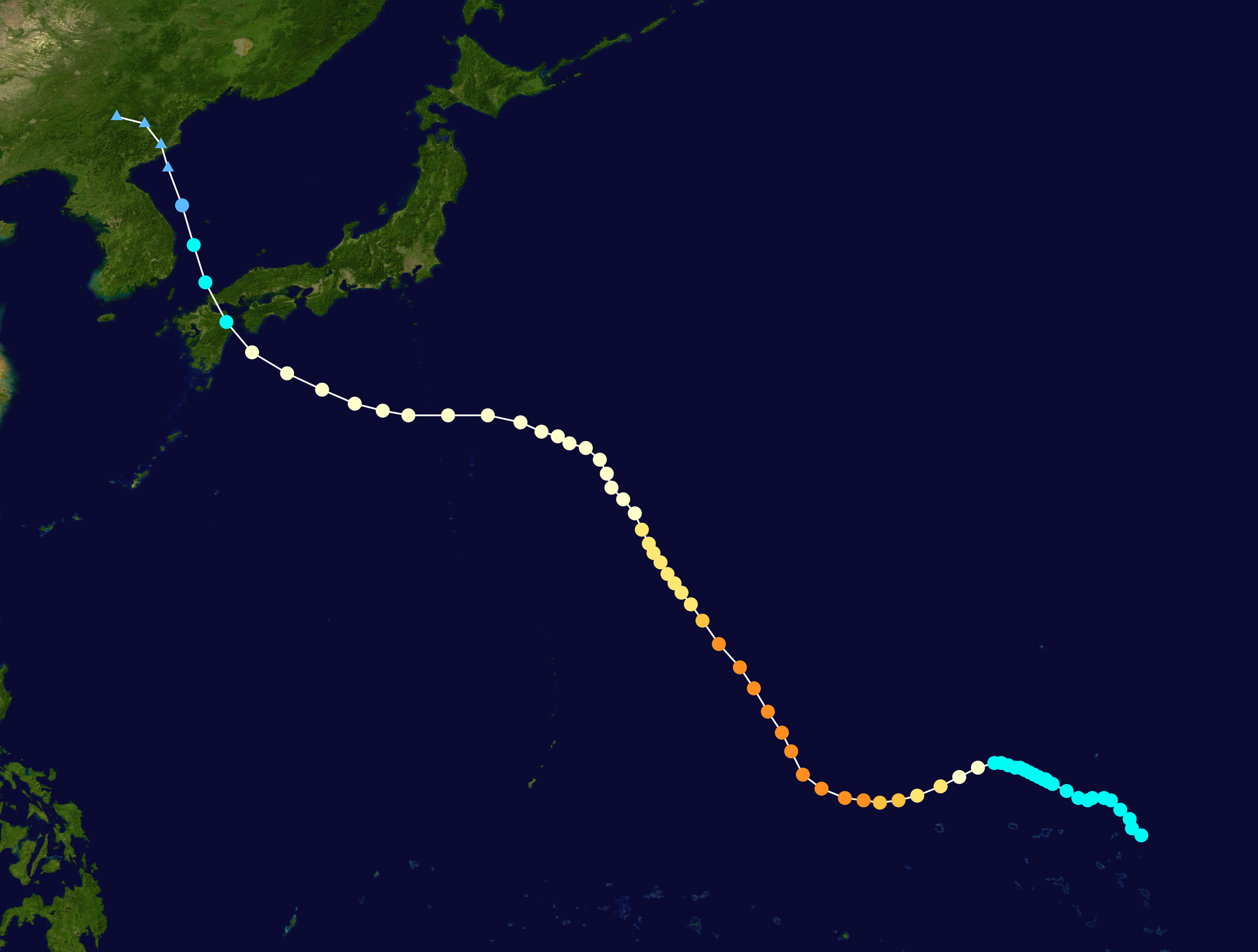
- Duration: July 7 – July 24
- Peak intensity: 230 km/h (145 mph) (1-min); 940 hPa (mbar)

The same near-equatorial trough that developed Rita also developed Typhoon Tess. Tess, having developed on July 7 near the Marshall Islands, tracked westward, reaching typhoon status on July 12. Over the next two days, as Tess turned to the northwest, it rapidly intensified to a 145 mph (233 km/h) typhoon. Steadily weakening as it continued northwestward, Tess bent back to the west in response to the building of a high pressure cell over Japan. The Fujiwhara effect between Tess and Rita brought 75 mph (121 km/h) Typhoon Tess into Japan on July 23. After dissipating over Sea of Japan, Tess continued northward, and merged with a front south of Vladivostok on July 25.

In Japan, Tess caused strong flooding and strong surf. This killed 29 people, with 20 missing. These casualties were mostly swimmers caught in the surf.

=== Typhoon Viola ===
- Typhoon (JMA)
- Tropical storm (SSHWS)
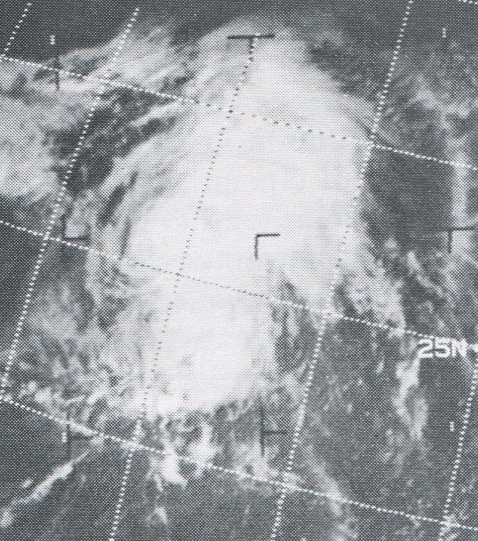
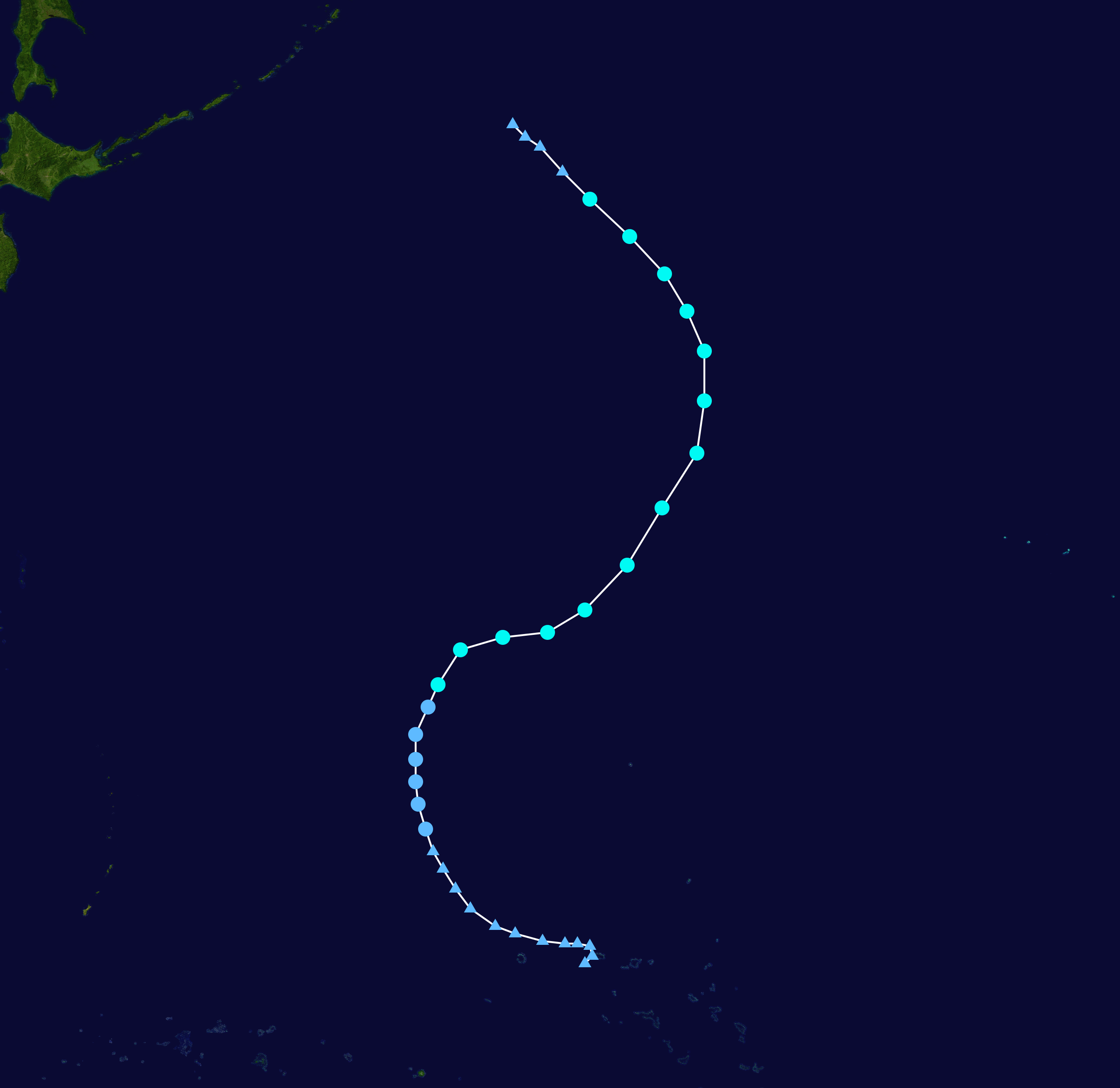
- Duration: July 19 – July 27
- Peak intensity: 110 km/h (70 mph) (1-min); 975 hPa (mbar)

Typhoon Viola (classified as a tropical storm by the JTWC) spent its entire life far offshore. Its precursor disturbance formed south of Wake Island on the 21st, and it traveled westwards then northwards at around 160 degrees west, before turning back eastwards on the 24th and eventually becoming extratropical on the 26th.

=== Tropical Depression Huaning ===
- Tropical depression (PAGASA)
- Duration: July 29 – July 30
- Peak intensity: 55 km/h (35 mph) (10-min);

=== Tropical Storm Winnie (Isang) ===
- Tropical storm (JMA)
- Tropical storm (SSHWS)
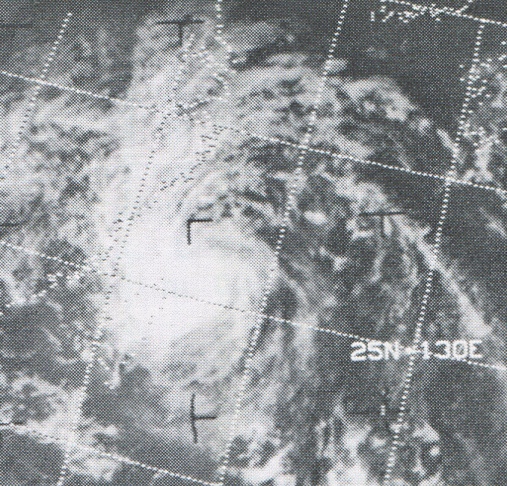
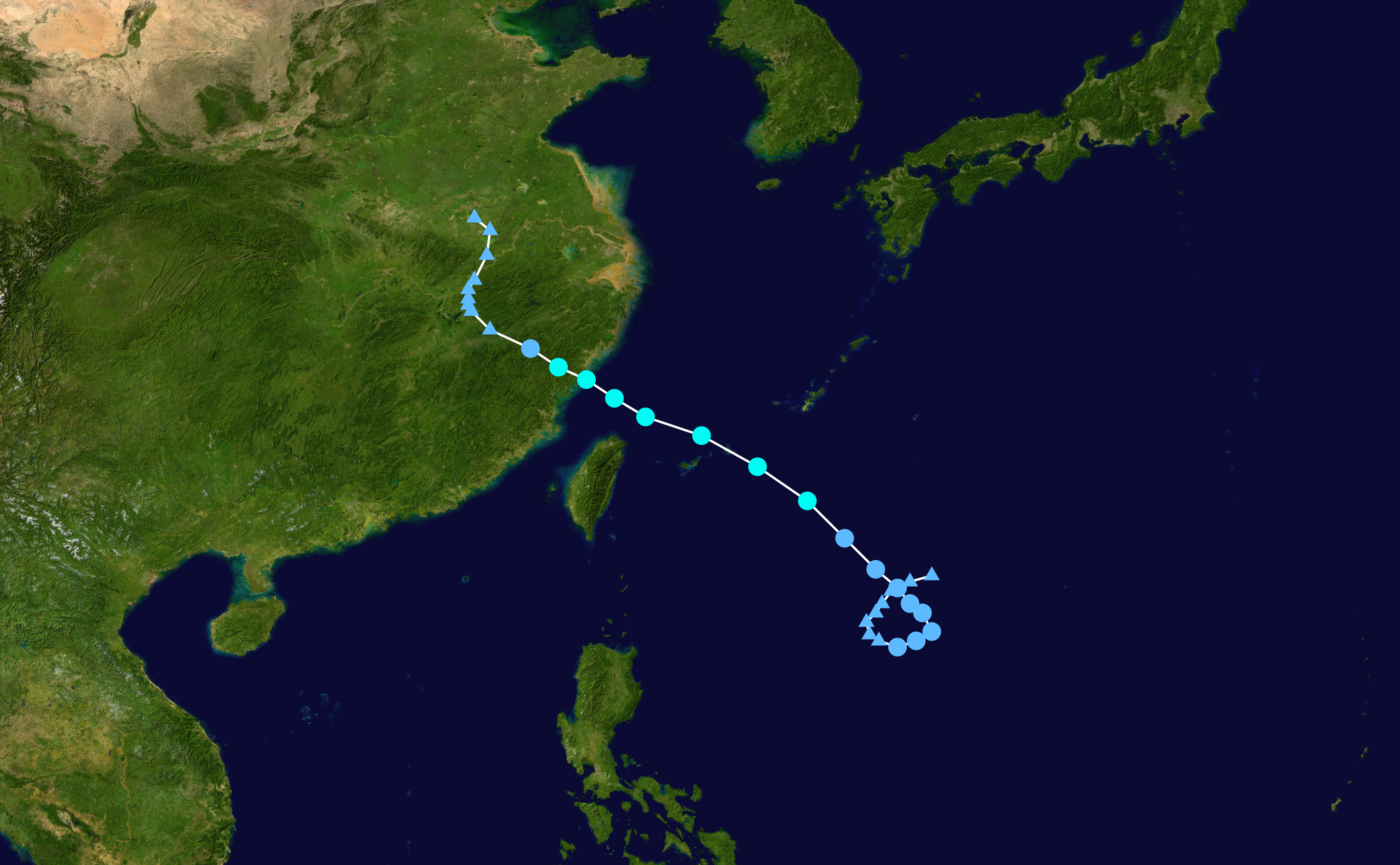
- Duration: July 29 – August 3
- Peak intensity: 110 km/h (70 mph) (1-min); 990 hPa (mbar)

Tropical Storm Winnie formed as a disturbance far east of the Philippines. The disturbance did a small loop, then headed northwestwards, intensifying into a tropical storm at midnight on the 30th. It continued, traveling north of the island of Taiwan before making landfall in China on the 1st of August. The storm quickly weakened into a disturbance, which traveled slowly inland before dissipating.

=== Typhoon Alice ===
- Typhoon (JMA)
- Category 2-equivalent typhoon (SSHWS)
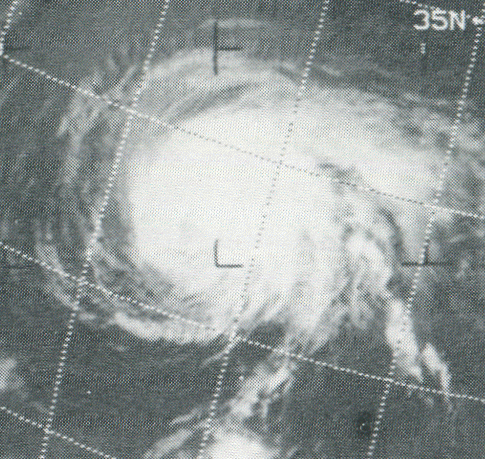
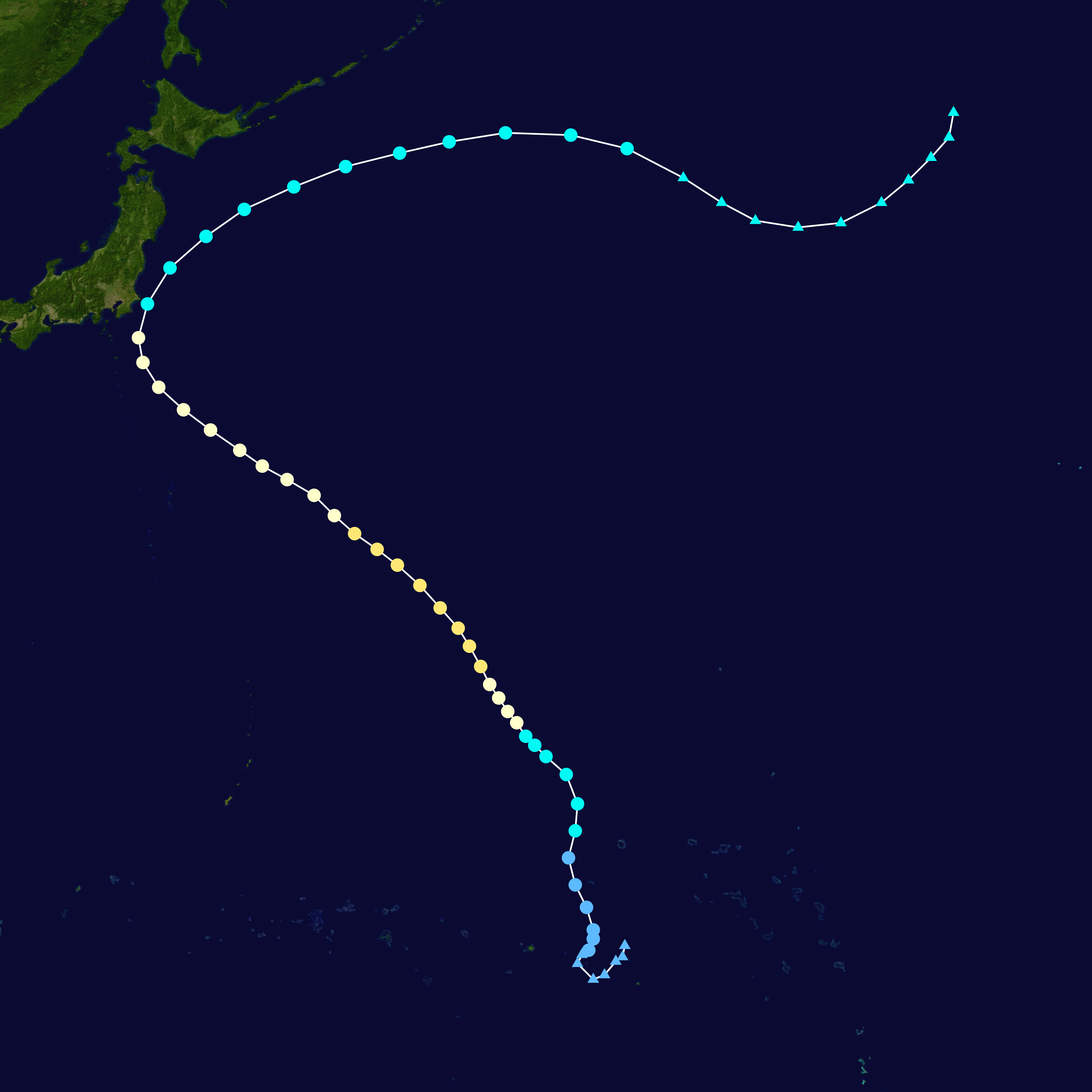
- Duration: July 28 – August 9
- Peak intensity: 165 km/h (105 mph) (1-min); 965 hPa (mbar)

A tropical disturbance emerged from the ITCZ on July 29 and passed through the Marshalls. It became a tropical depression on July 30 and a tropical storm the next day. It and headed in the direction of Japan. Alice became a typhoon on August 2 and reached its maximum intensity on August 4 while southwest of Marcus. As Alice continued approaching Japan, it steadily weakened. It recurved, brushed Honshu, and went extratropical on August 8. It never made landfall.

Waves generated by Alice's storm surge caused a river to overflow in Iwaki, which affected three hundred houses. No one was killed.

=== Typhoon Betty (Maring) ===
- Typhoon (JMA)
- Category 4-equivalent typhoon (SSHWS)
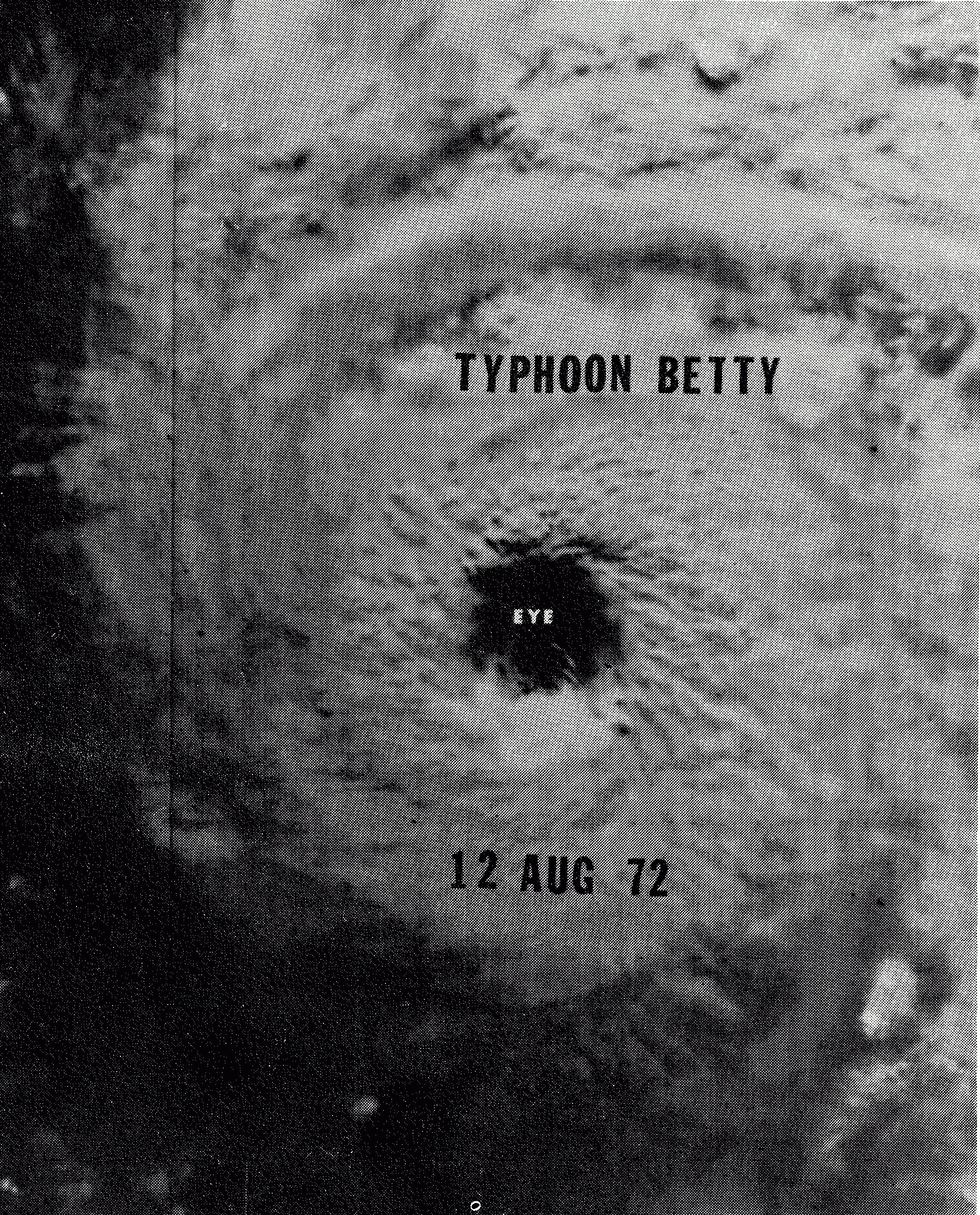
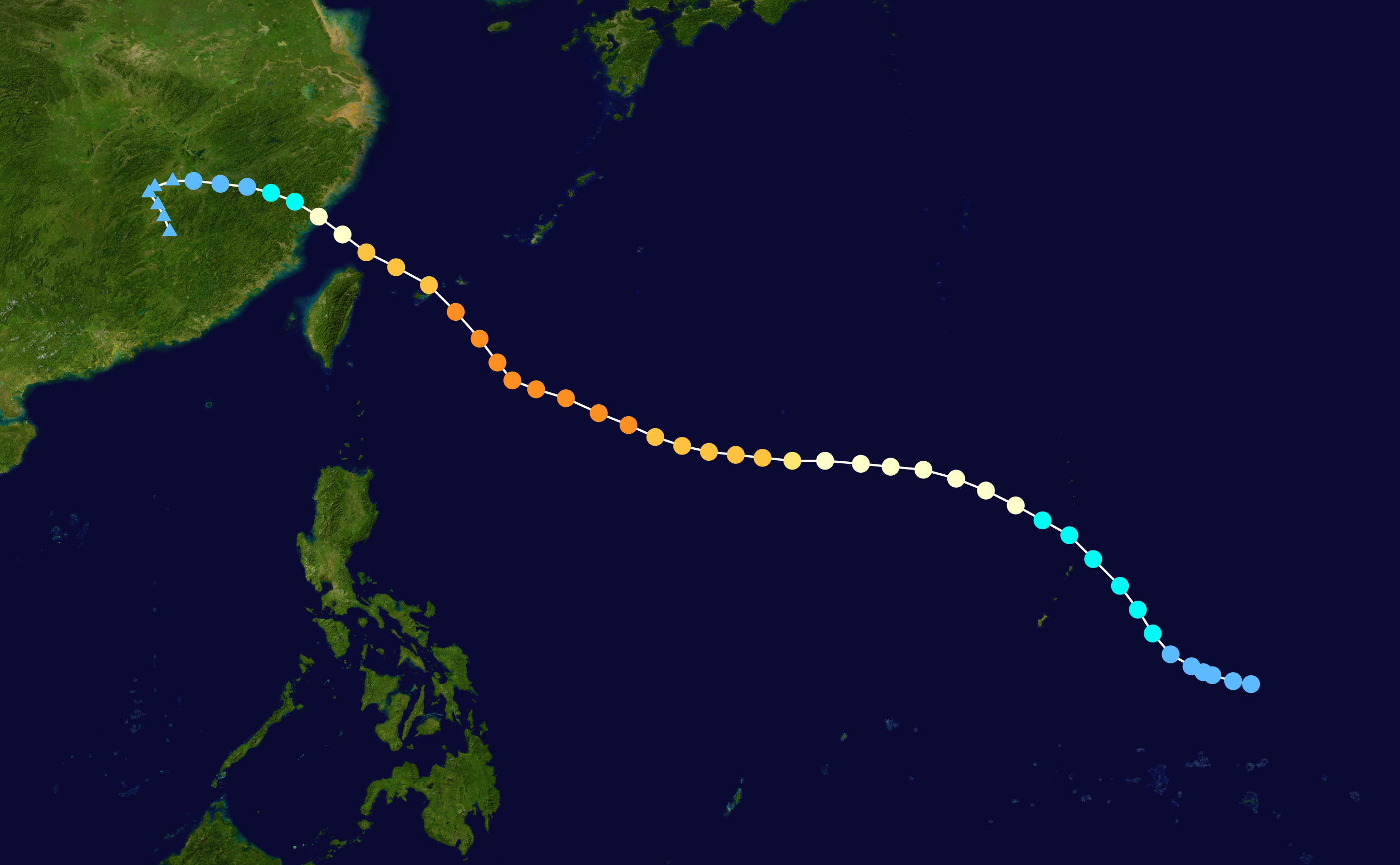
- Duration: August 8 – August 18
- Peak intensity: 250 km/h (155 mph) (1-min); 910 hPa (mbar)

A tropical depression formed near the Caroline Islands on August 8. It passed through the Marianas Islands after becoming a tropical storm. Betty turned to the west and peaked as a super typhoon on August 15. It turned to more to the west northwest, passed over the southern Ryukyus and just north of Taiwan, and made landfall on the coast China on August 17. It rapidly weakened inland, and dissipated the next day.

Betty had minimal effects in the Ryukyu Islands. In the Philippines, it enhanced monsoon rains. This caused flooding, which killed seven people in Ilocos Sur. Four other people were presumed dead after a light aircraft went missing. In Taiwan, rains were heavy. The resulting floods in Sanchong District stranded 300 thousand people, and washed out roads and railways. More than 220 houses were totally destroyed, with at least another 130 badly damaged. Betty killed eighteen people in Taiwan, and twenty-nine overall. The total cost of damage is unknown.

=== Tropical Depression Lusing ===
- Tropical depression (SSHWS)
- Duration: August 10 – August 13
- Peak intensity: 55 km/h (35 mph) (1-min);

=== Typhoon Cora ===
- Typhoon (JMA)
- Category 1-equivalent typhoon (SSHWS)
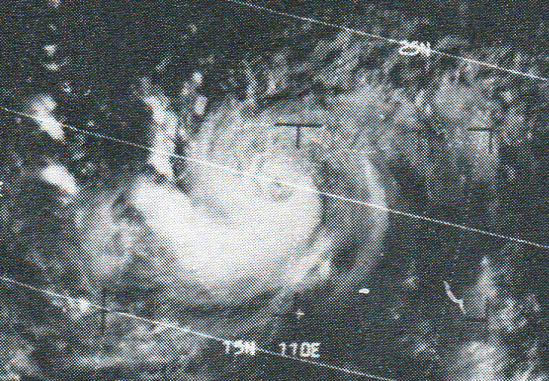
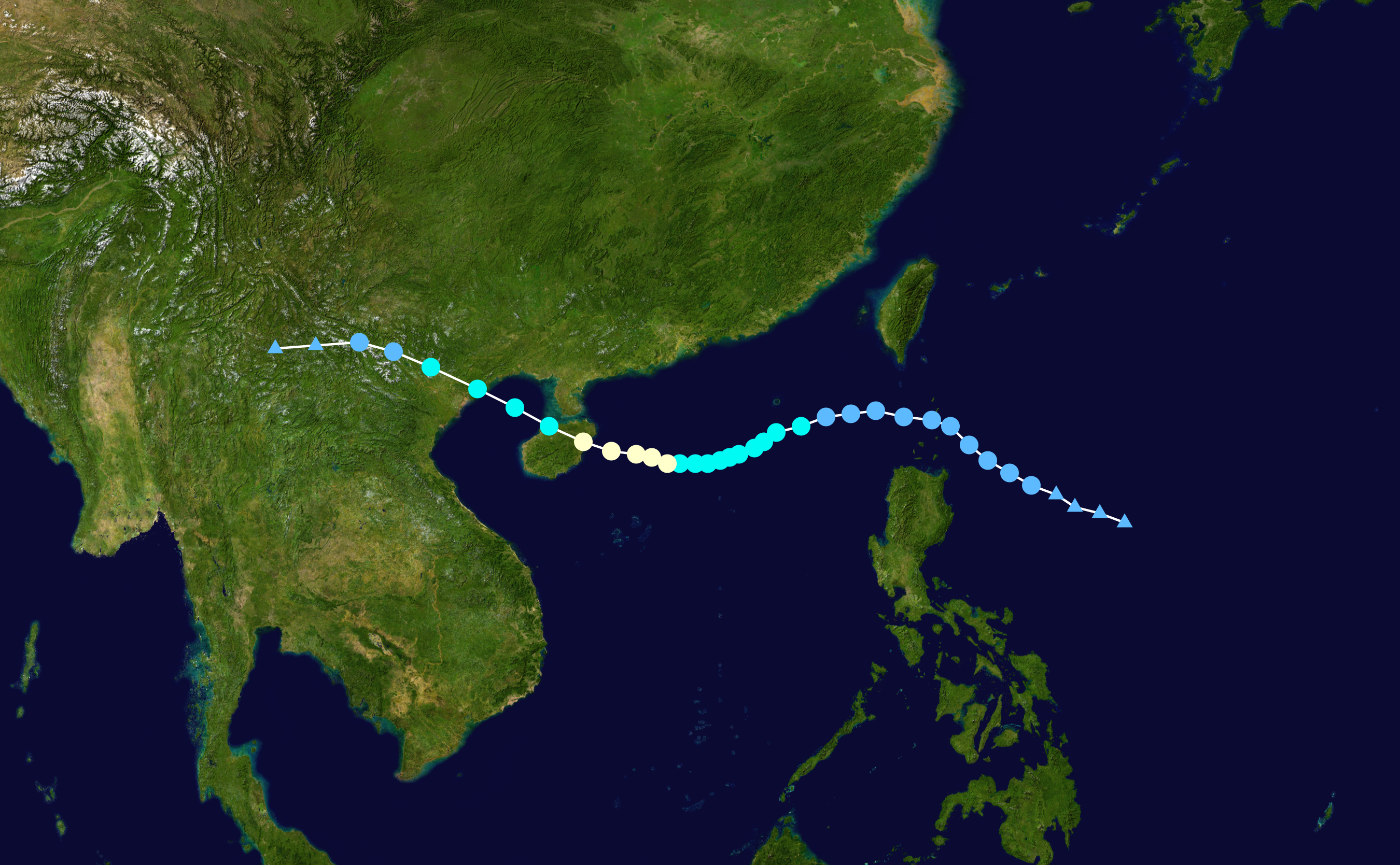
- Duration: August 24 – August 29
- Peak intensity: 120 km/h (75 mph) (1-min); 975 hPa (mbar)

A disturbance west of Luzon became a tropical depression on August 22. It headed into the South China Sea and strengthened into a tropical storm. As it approached Hainan, it became only the fourth August tropical cyclone to intensify into a typhoon in the South China Sea since 1945. It made landfall on Hainan on August 28, emerged into the Gulf of Tonkin, and made a second landfall north of Haiphong. Cora had dissipated inland by August 29.

No damage was reported, and no one was killed.

=== Severe Tropical Storm Doris ===
- Severe tropical storm (JMA)
- Tropical storm (SSHWS)
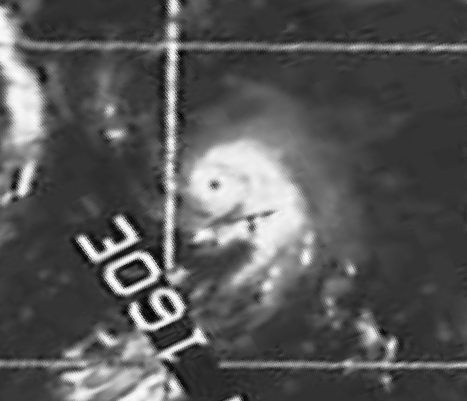
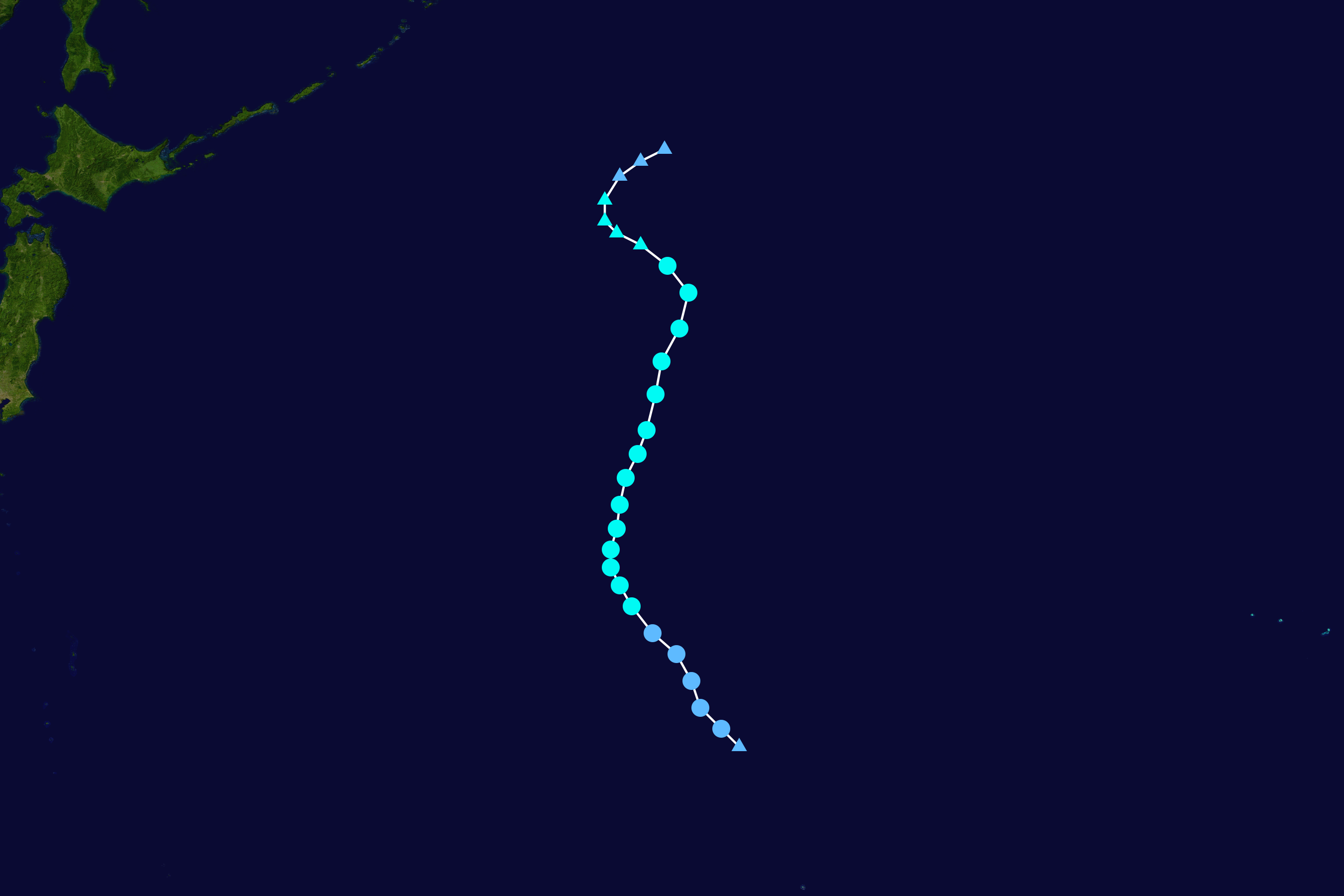
- Duration: August 25 – August 29
- Peak intensity: 100 km/h (65 mph) (1-min); 985 hPa (mbar)

Tropical Storm Doris stayed far from land. It formed far north of Wake Island and traveled north, becoming a tropical storm on the 26th, but it became extratropical on the 29th and dissipated shortly thereafter.

=== Typhoon Elsie ===
- Typhoon (JMA)
- Category 1-equivalent typhoon (SSHWS)
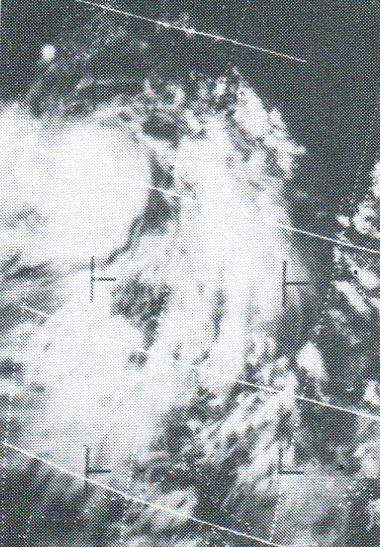
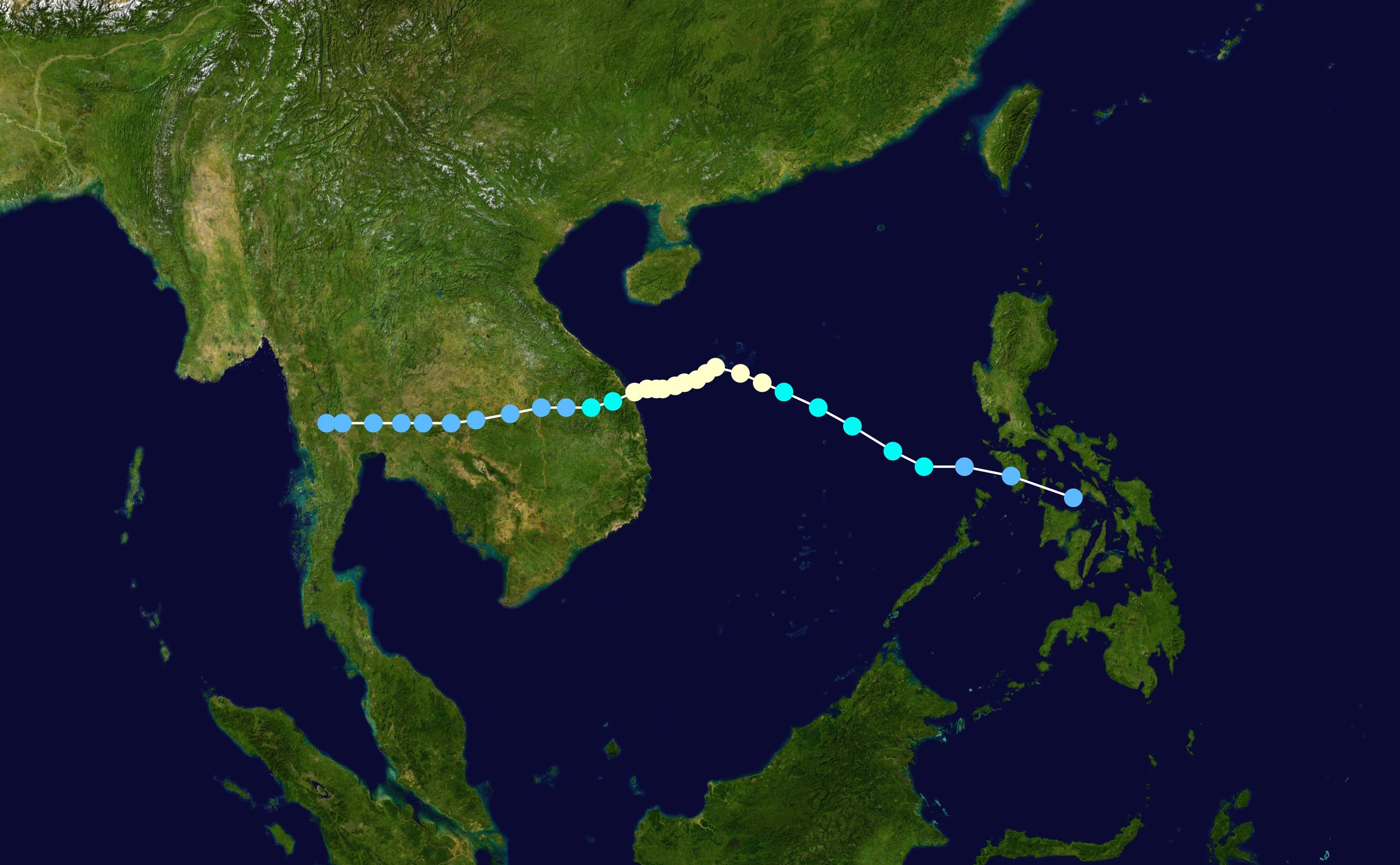
- Duration: August 31 – September 6
- Peak intensity: 140 km/h (85 mph) (1-min); 975 hPa (mbar)

West of Leyte Gulf, a tropical depression formed on August 30. It intensified into a tropical storm after entering the South China Sea. It strengthened into a typhoon on September 1 and slowed down. It made landfall in northern South Vietnam on September 4. It rapidly weakened inland but kept its identity. It transited the Indochina Peninsula and emerged into the Bay of Bengal on September 7, becoming Tropical Cyclone 24-72 of the 1972 North Indian Ocean cyclone season. Ex-Elsie gradually restrengthened as it crossed the Bay of Bengal. It made landfall on the coast of India on September 10 and rapidly dissipated inland.

While crossing Thailand, Elsie caused heavy flooding. No other impact was reported to the JTWC.

=== Typhoon Flossie (Nitang) ===
- Typhoon (JMA)
- Category 1-equivalent typhoon (SSHWS)
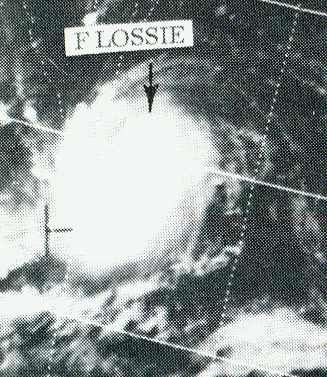
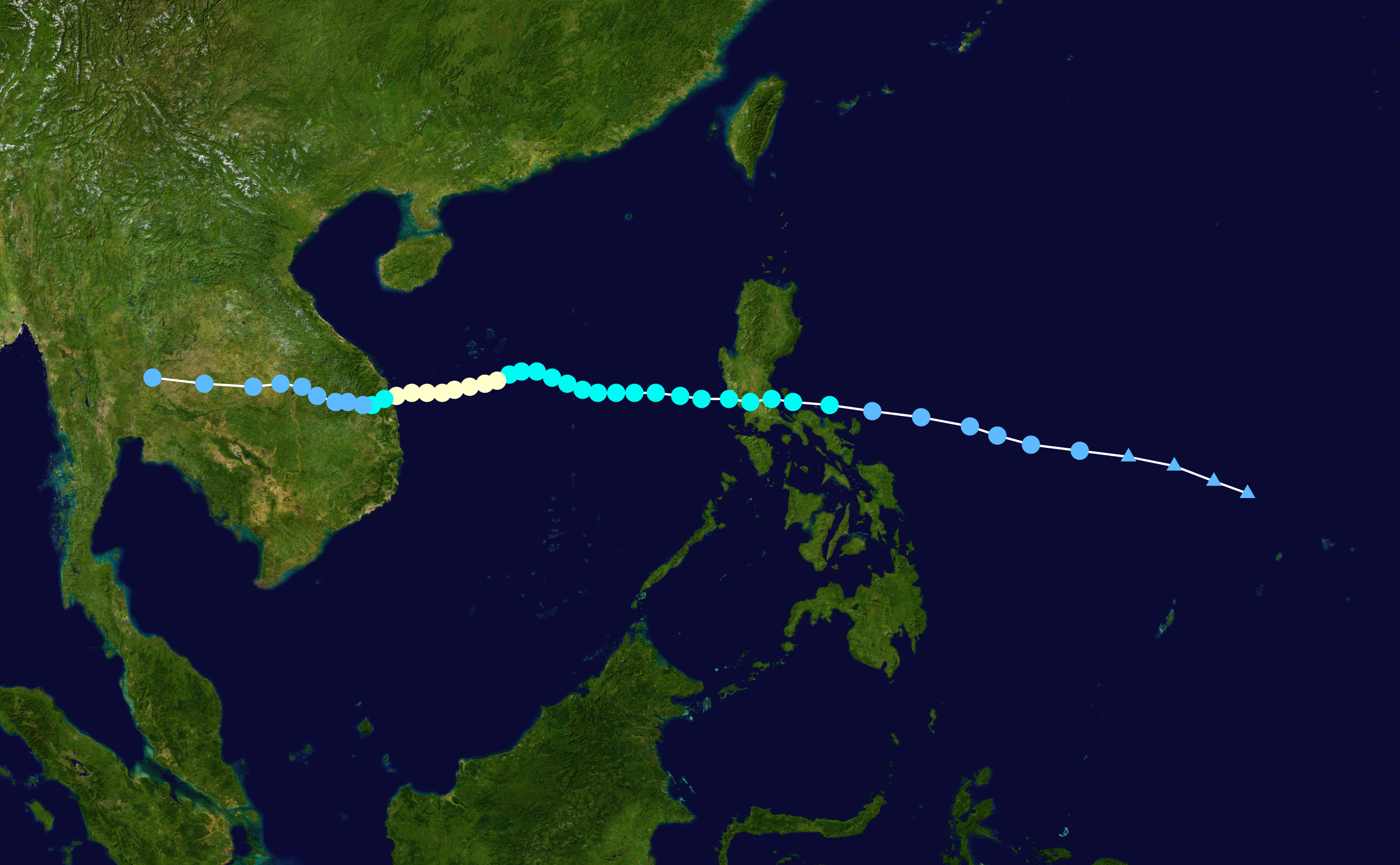
- Duration: September 7 – September 18
- Peak intensity: 140 km/h (85 mph) (1-min); 975 hPa (mbar)

Typhoon Flossie formed as a disturbance west of Guam late on the 5th of September. The system intensified into a tropical storm just before landfall on Luzon. The cyclone then traveled slowly across the South China Sea, becoming a low-level typhoon before making landfall in Vietnam on the 16th. It weakened to a tropical depression as it crossed Vietnam, but it reintensified after entering the Bay of Bengal as Tropical Cyclone 25-72 (10B).

=== Tropical Storm Grace (Osang) ===
- Tropical storm (JMA)
- Tropical storm (SSHWS)
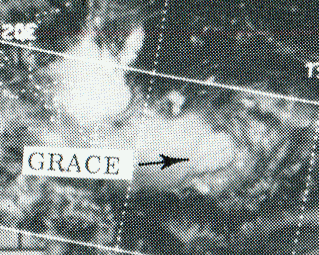
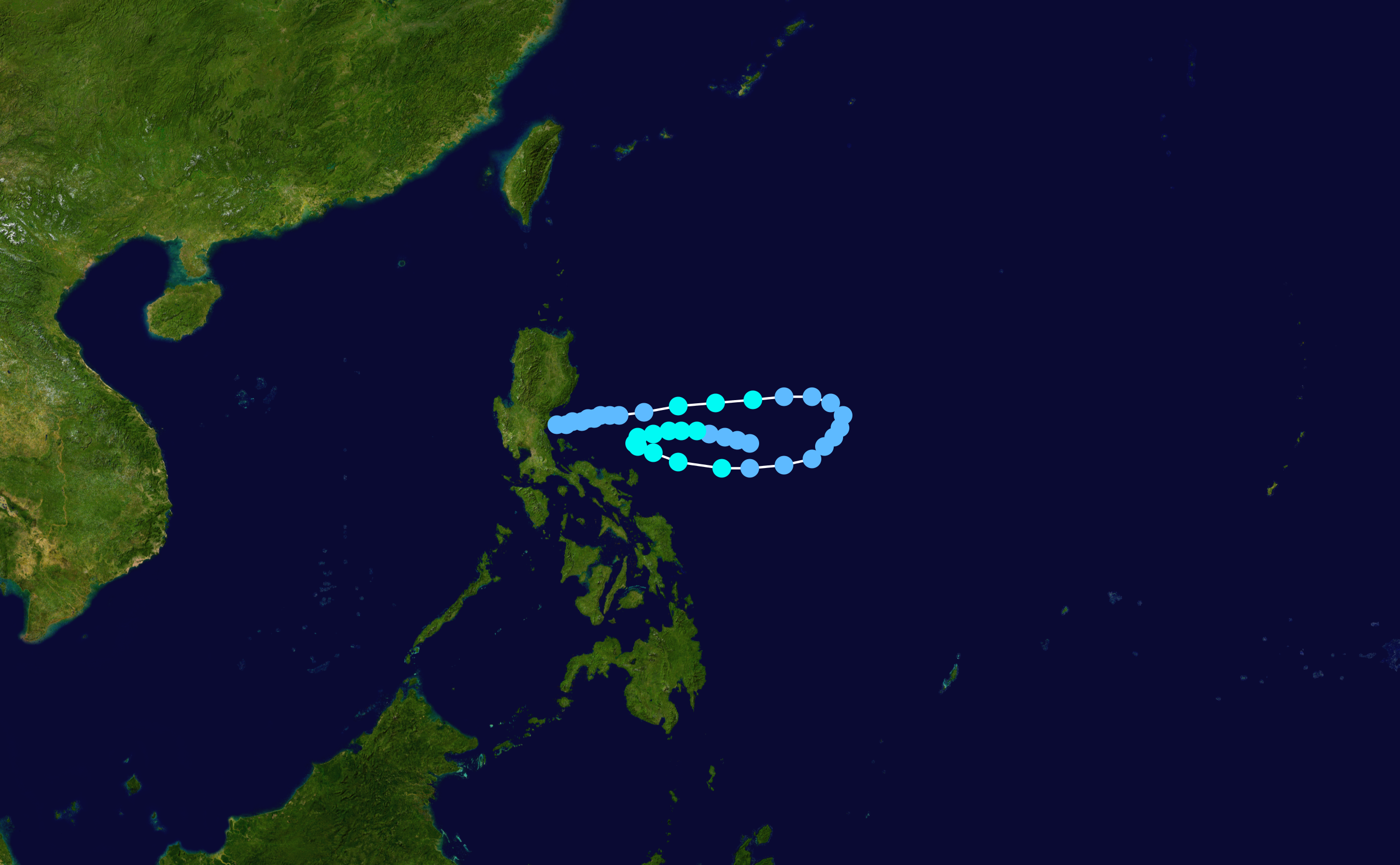
- Duration: September 11 – September 14
- Peak intensity: 95 km/h (60 mph) (1-min); 990 hPa (mbar)

=== Typhoon Helen (Paring) ===
- Typhoon (JMA)
- Category 3-equivalent typhoon (SSHWS)
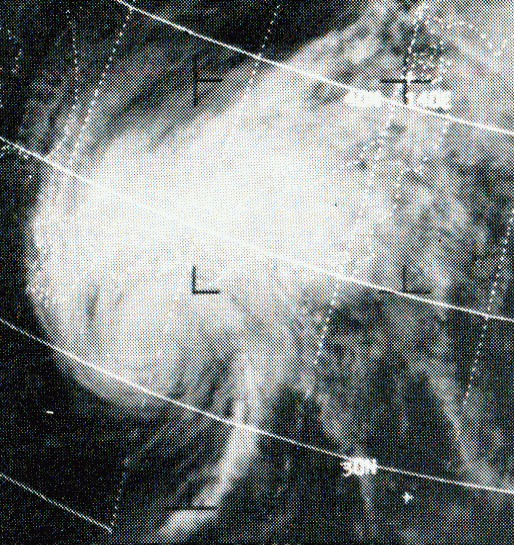
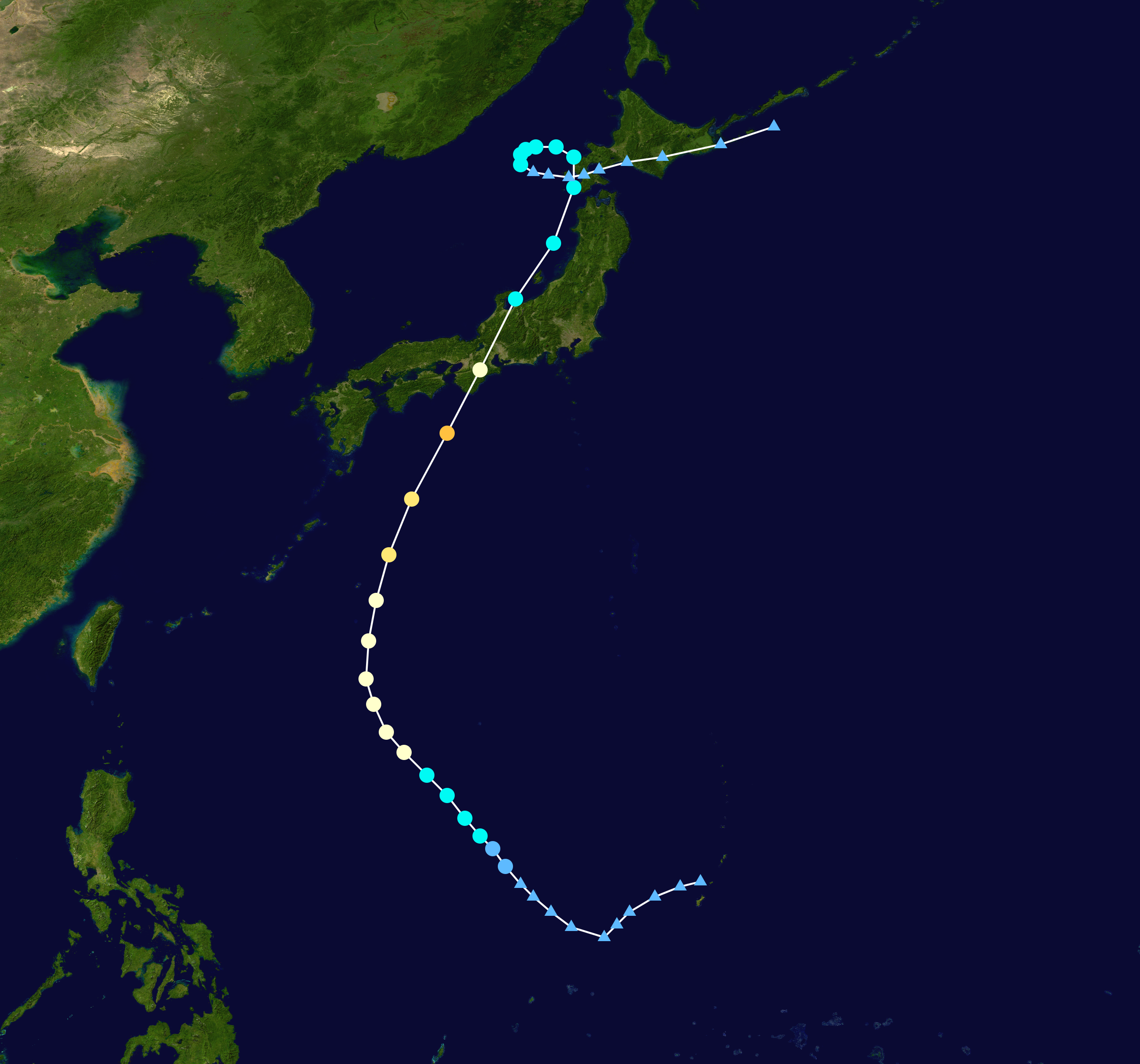
- Duration: September 10 – September 18
- Peak intensity: 185 km/h (115 mph) (1-min); 955 hPa (mbar)

Typhoon Helen was the most destructive tropical cyclone to strike Japan during the 1972 Pacific typhoon season. Originating from a tropical disturbance on September 11 near the Northern Mariana Islands, Helen gradually intensified as it moved northwestward. By September 14, it reached typhoon strength and soon turned northeast towards Japan. Accelerating due to a trough over the East China Sea, Helen rapidly approached the country and made landfall near Cape Kushimoto as a Category 3-equivalent typhoon on the Saffir–Simpson hurricane scale. Later that day, a weakened Helen emerged into the Sea of Japan. After merging with an upper-level low, the storm transitioned into an extratropical cyclone on September 19 and was last noted two days later after moving through southern Hokkaido.

In Japan, Typhoon Helen produced torrential rain, peaking at 790 mm (31 in) in Hokkaido, and damaging winds that caused widespread damage. A total of 4,213 homes were destroyed and another 146,547 were damaged as a result of flash flooding and landslides. Numerous vessels ran aground due to rough seas associated with the storm, including several thousand ton cargo freighters. In all, 87 fatalities and $102 million in damage was attributed to Typhoon Helen.

=== Tropical Depression 21W ===
- Tropical depression (JMA)
- Tropical depression (SSHWS)
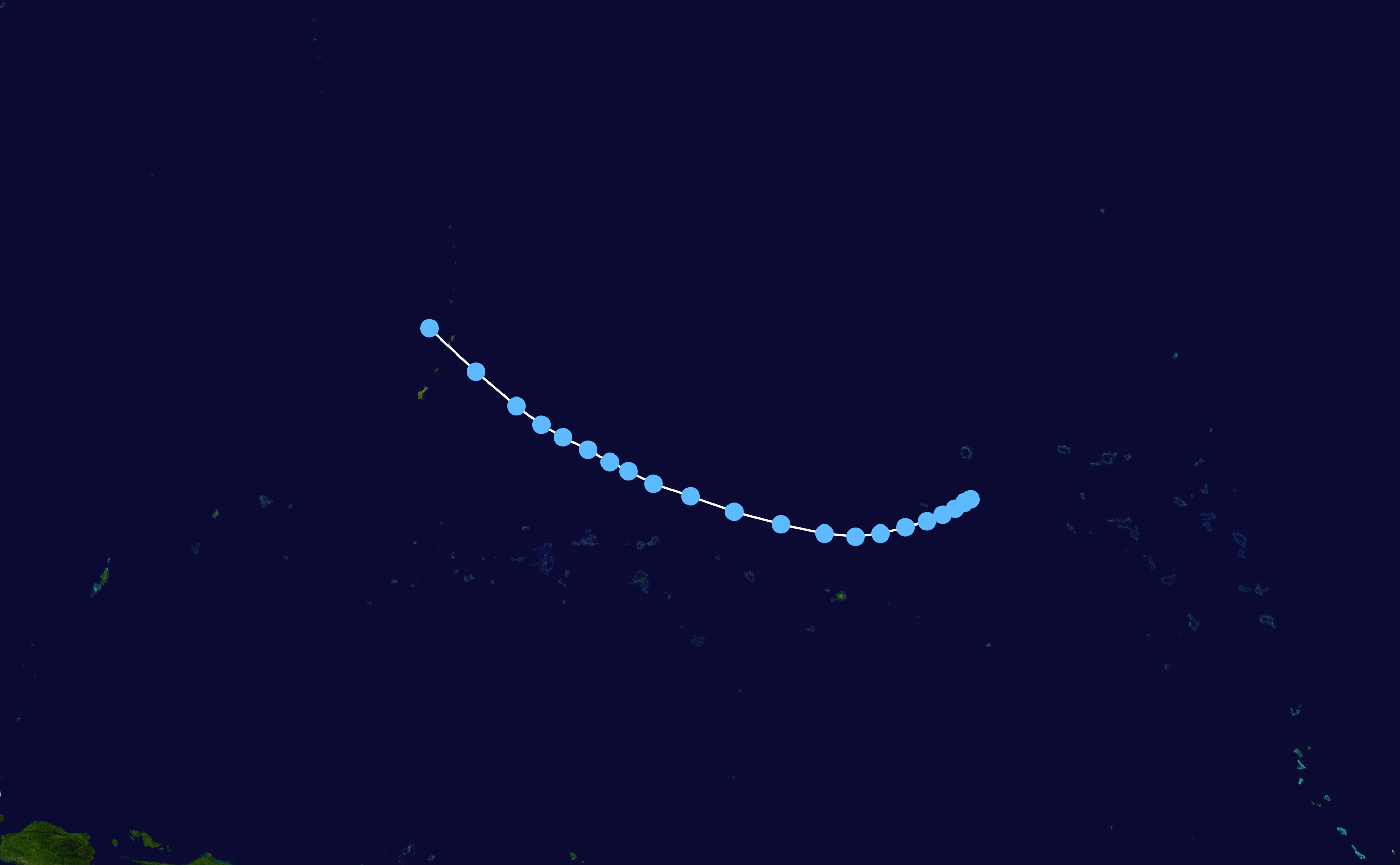
- Duration: September 13 – September 15
- Peak intensity: 55 km/h (35 mph) (1-min); 1000 hPa (mbar)

=== Typhoon Ida ===
- Typhoon (JMA)
- Category 3-equivalent typhoon (SSHWS)
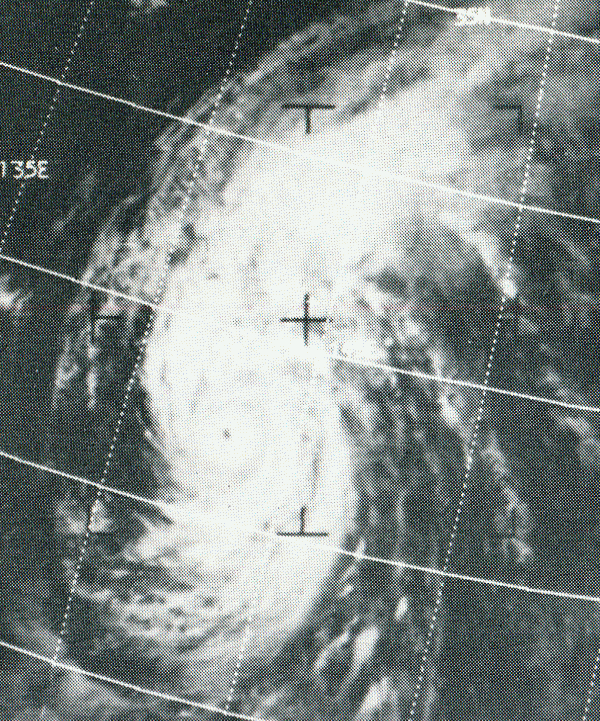
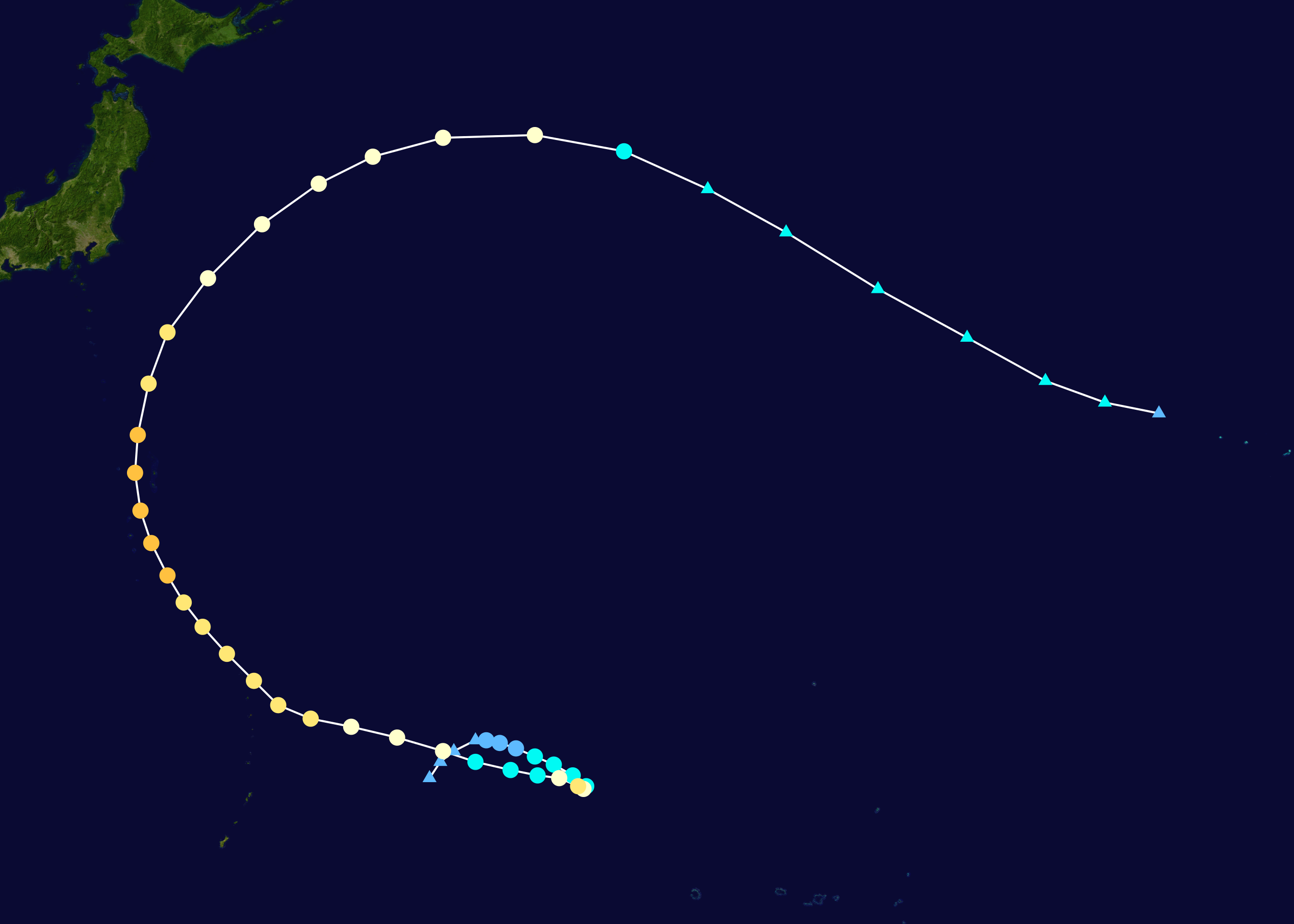
- Duration: September 16 – September 25
- Peak intensity: 205 km/h (125 mph) (1-min); 930 hPa (mbar)

=== Tropical Depression Reming ===
- Tropical depression (SSHWS)
- Duration: September 17 – September 19
- Peak intensity: 55 km/h (35 mph) (1-min);

=== Typhoon Kathy ===
- Typhoon (JMA)
- Tropical storm (SSHWS)
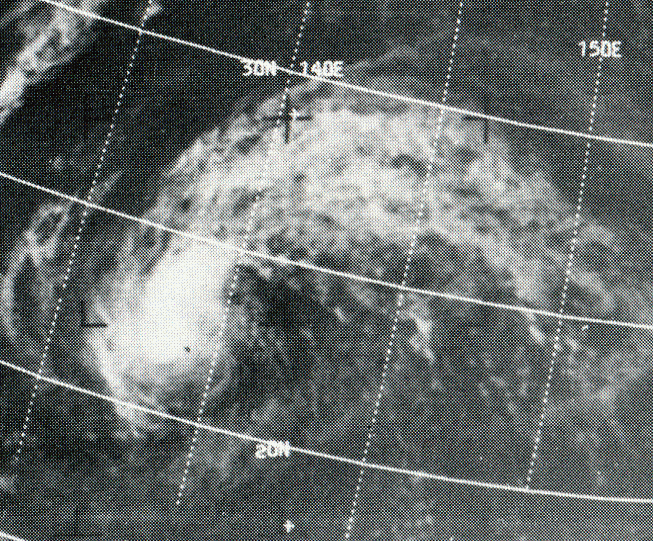
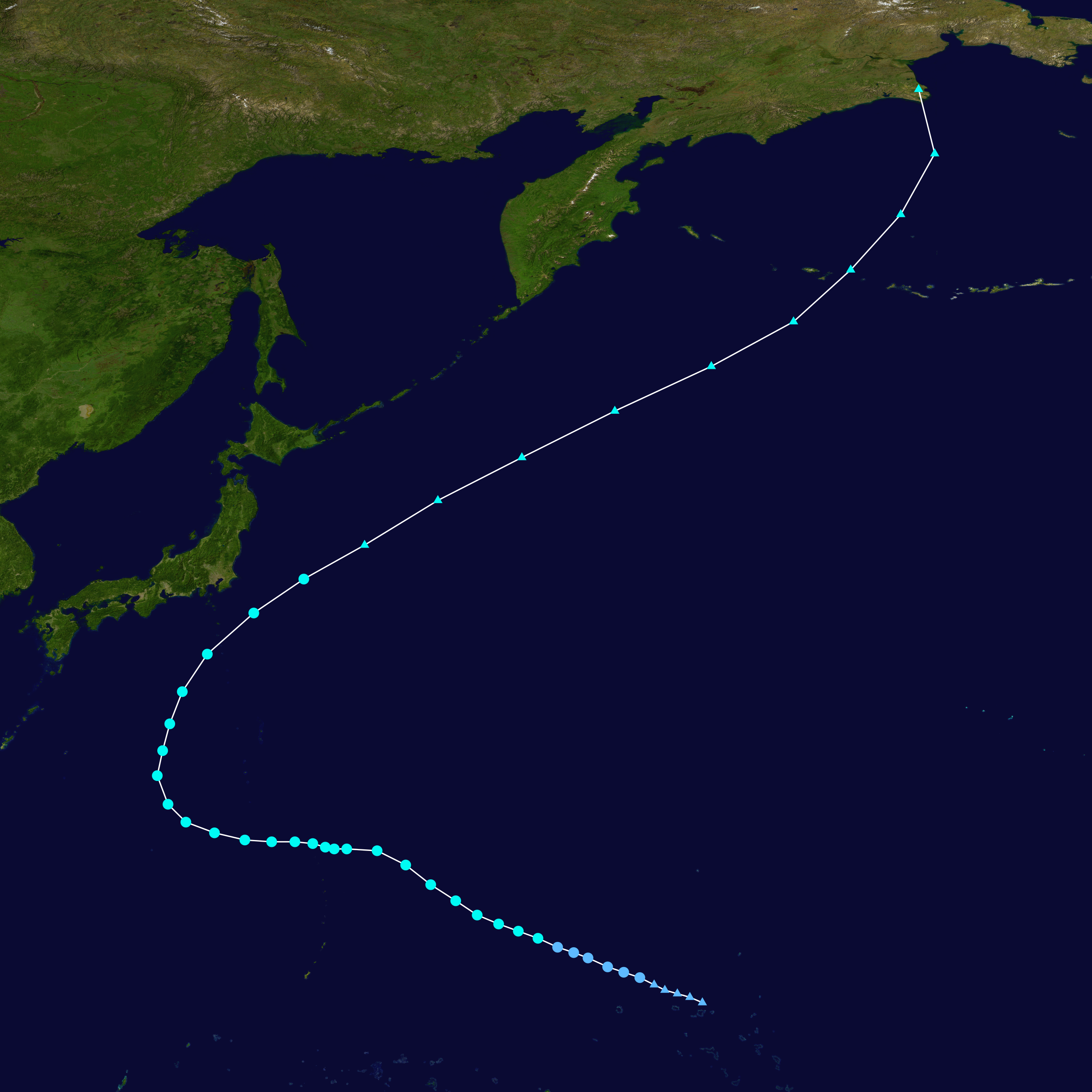
- Duration: September 27 – October 6
- Peak intensity: 110 km/h (70 mph) (1-min); 980 hPa (mbar)

=== Typhoon Lorna ===
- Typhoon (JMA)
- Category 1-equivalent typhoon (SSHWS)
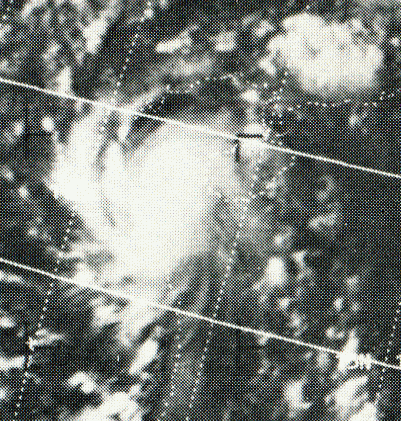
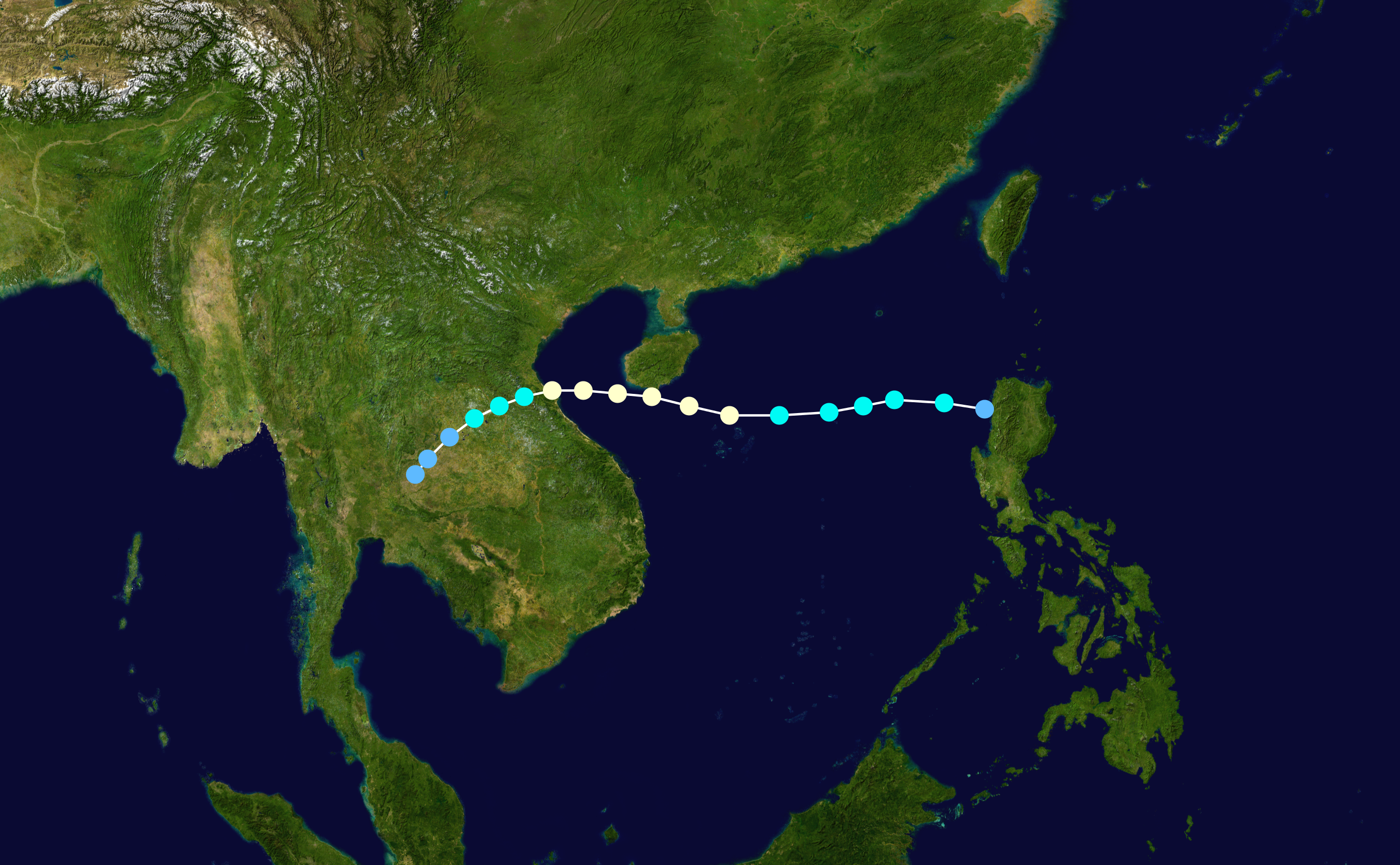
- Duration: September 27 – October 3
- Peak intensity: 140 km/h (85 mph) (1-min); 990 hPa (mbar)

=== Typhoon Marie ===
- Typhoon (JMA)
- Category 4-equivalent typhoon (SSHWS)
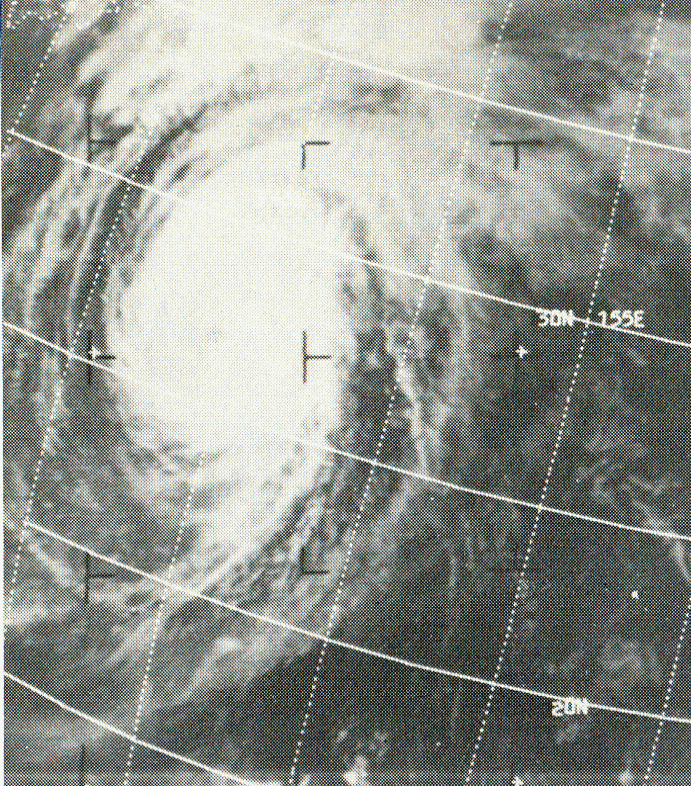
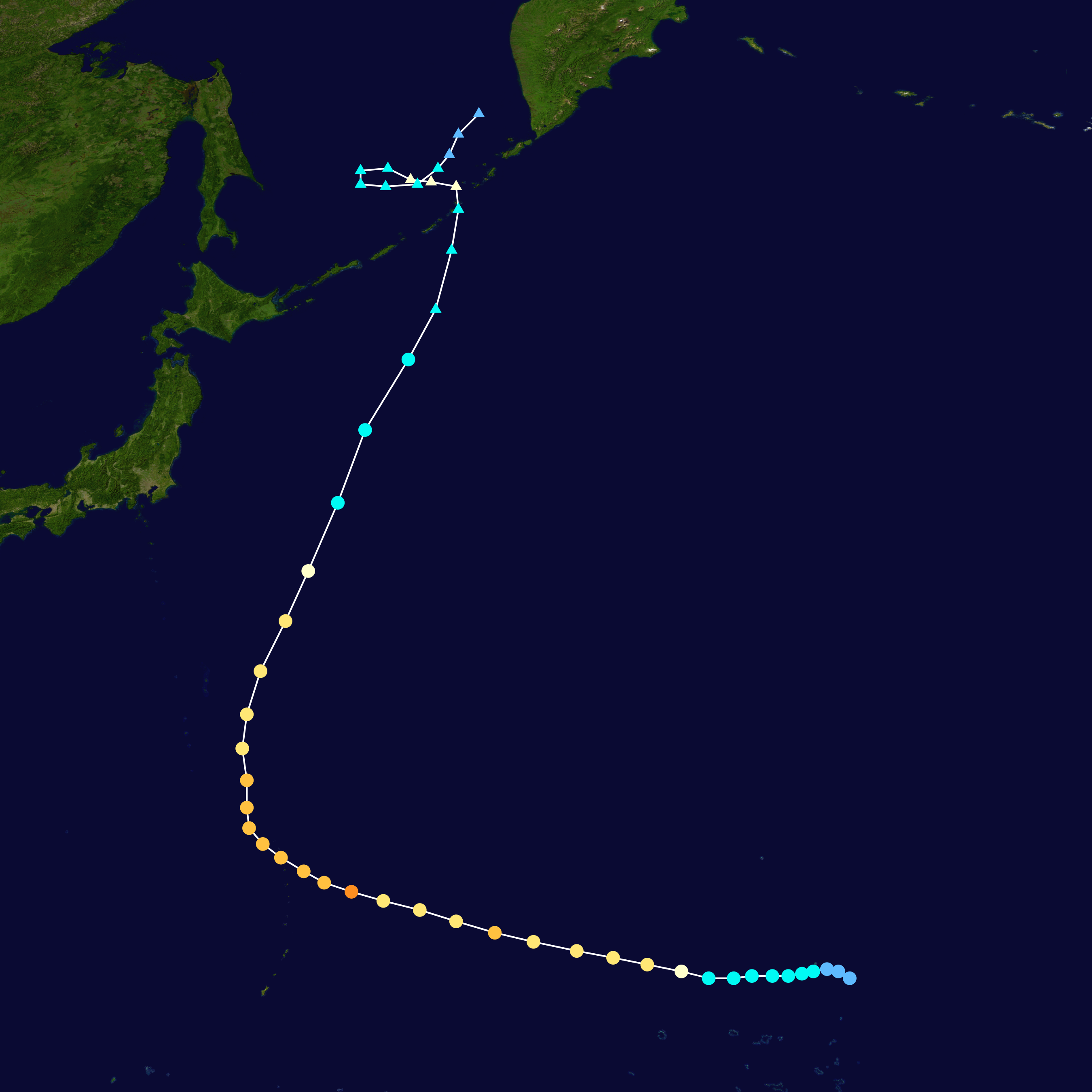
- Duration: October 4 – October 16
- Peak intensity: 215 km/h (130 mph) (1-min); 935 hPa (mbar)

Typhoon Marie formed on October 4 and tracked westwards, while it intensified into a category 4 typhoon. Soon after reaching peak intensity, Marie weakened and turned northward and affected the northern Soviet Union and Japan until it transitioned into an extratropical cyclone on October 16. Marie did not inflict much damage during its 12-day duration.

=== Typhoon Nancy ===
- Typhoon (JMA)
- Category 3-equivalent typhoon (SSHWS)
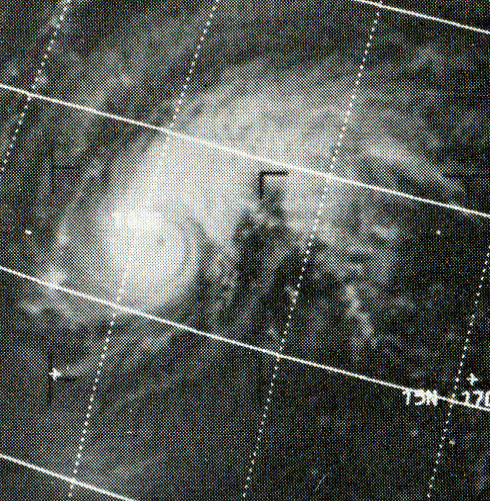
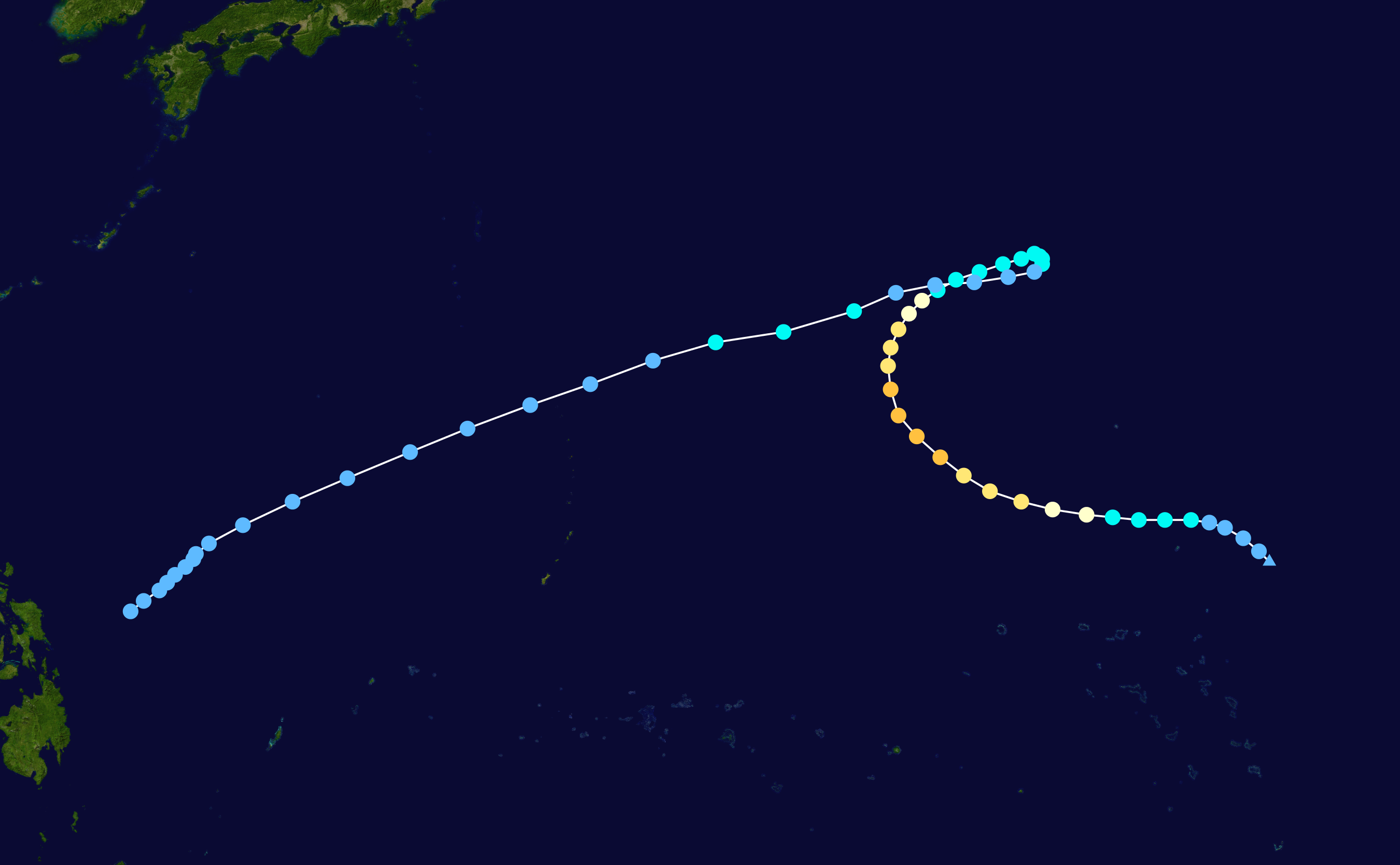
- Duration: October 16 – October 26
- Peak intensity: 195 km/h (120 mph) (1-min); 945 hPa (mbar)

=== Tropical Depression Seniang ===
- Tropical depression (PAGASA)
- Duration: October 17 – October 19
- Peak intensity: 55 km/h (35 mph) (10-min);

=== Typhoon Olga ===
- Typhoon (JMA)
- Category 3-equivalent typhoon (SSHWS)
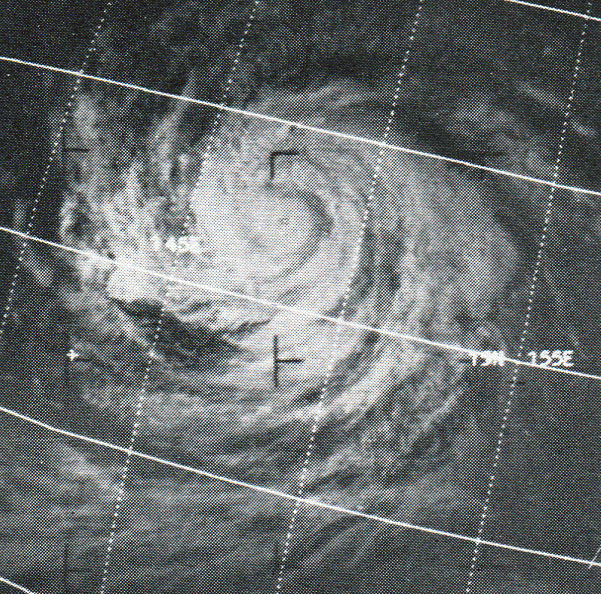
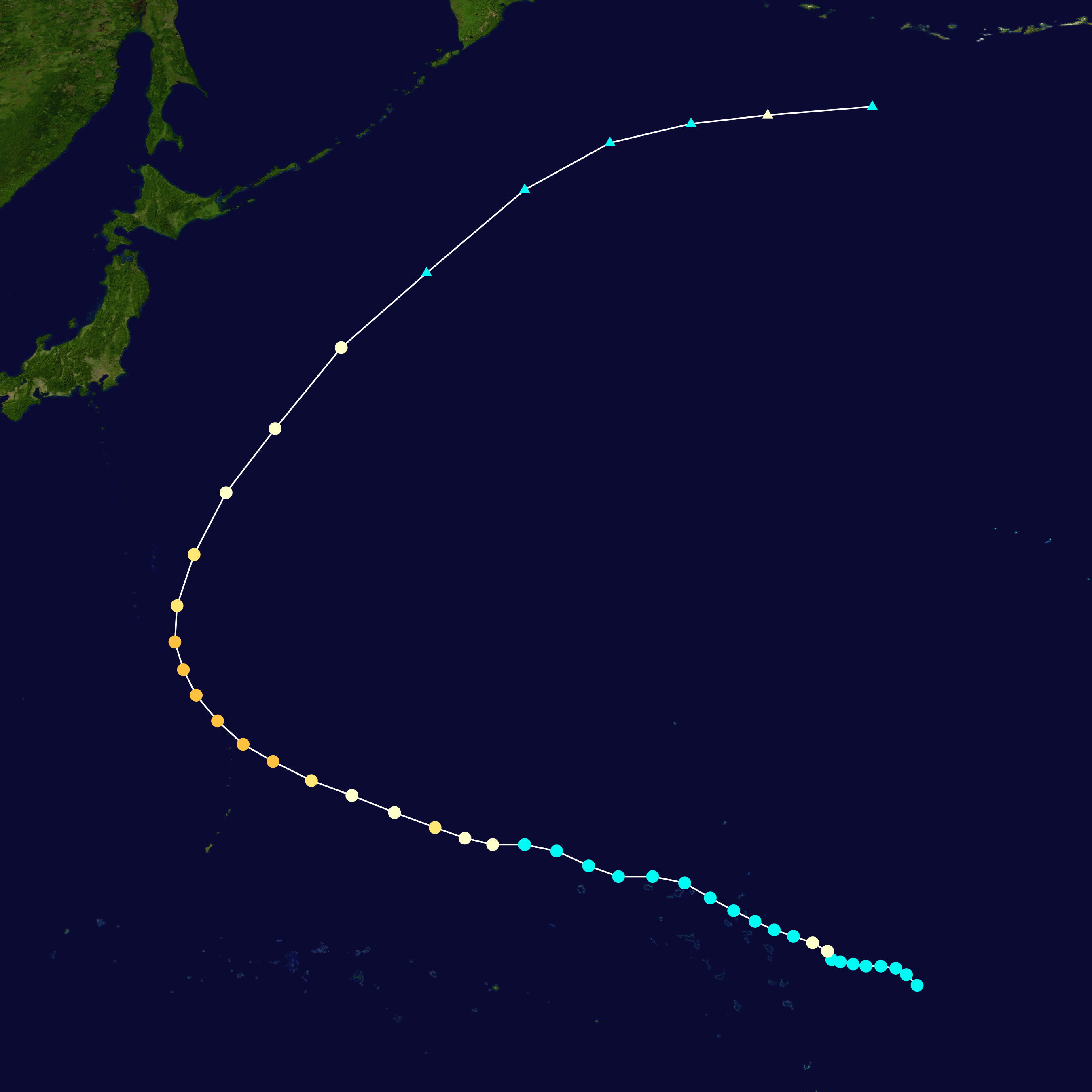
- Duration: October 21 – October 29
- Peak intensity: 195 km/h (120 mph) (1-min); 940 hPa (mbar)

=== Typhoon Pamela (Toyang) ===
- Typhoon (JMA)
- Category 3-equivalent typhoon (SSHWS)
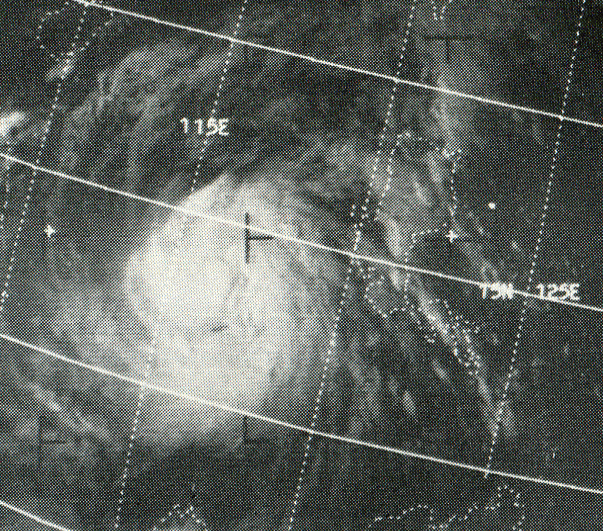
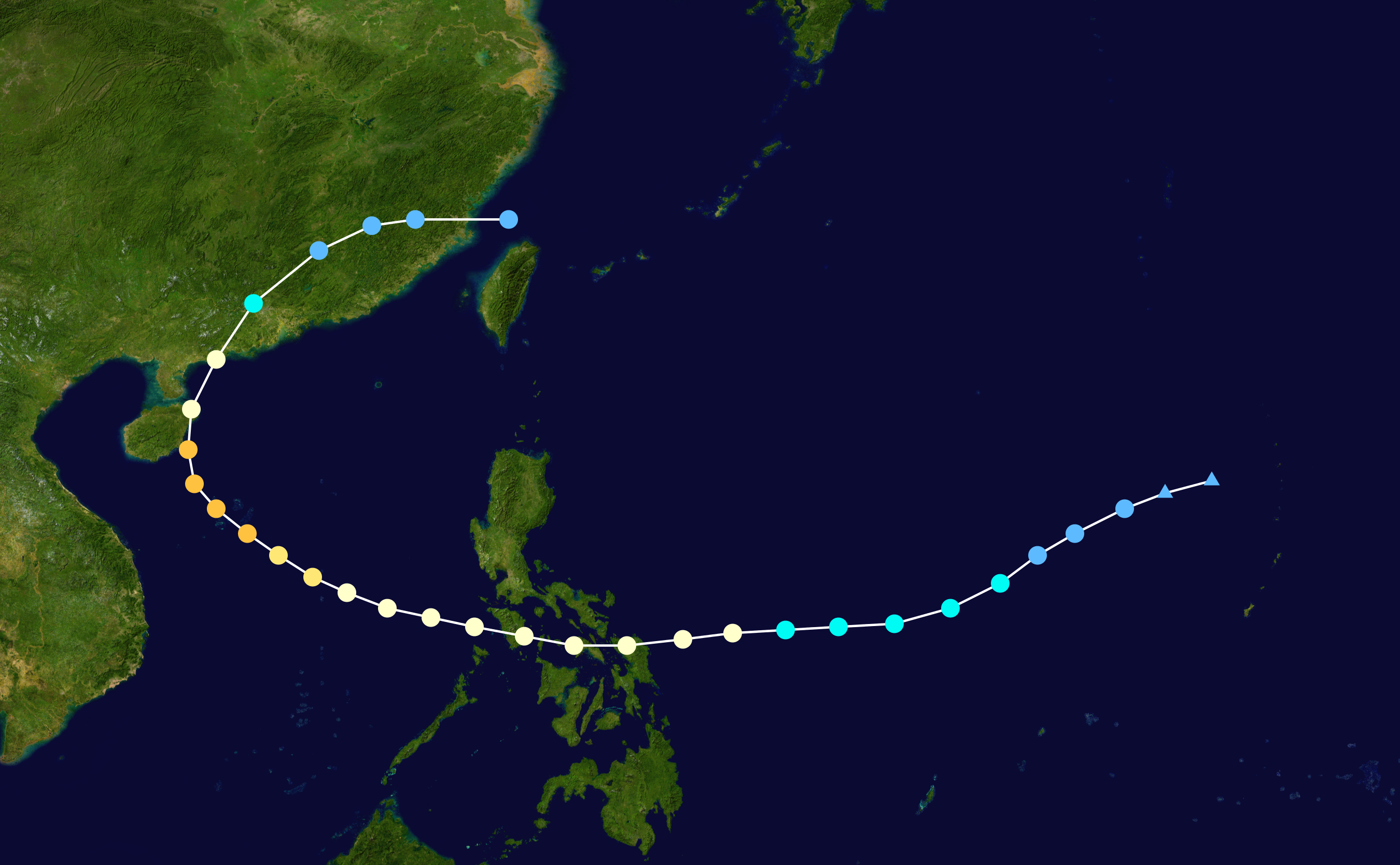
- Duration: November 2 – November 9
- Peak intensity: 205 km/h (125 mph) (1-min); 940 hPa (mbar)

Typhoon Pamela struck Hong Kong killing one person.

=== Typhoon Ruby ===
- Typhoon (JMA)
- Category 3-equivalent typhoon (SSHWS)
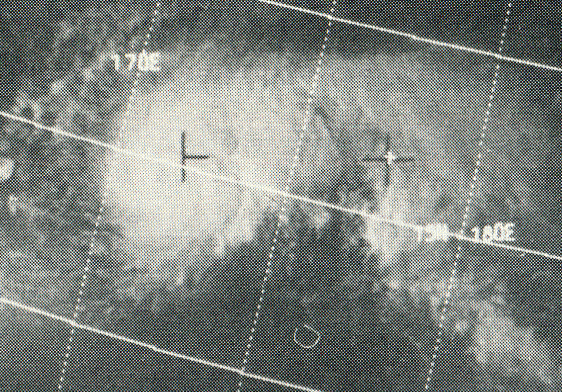
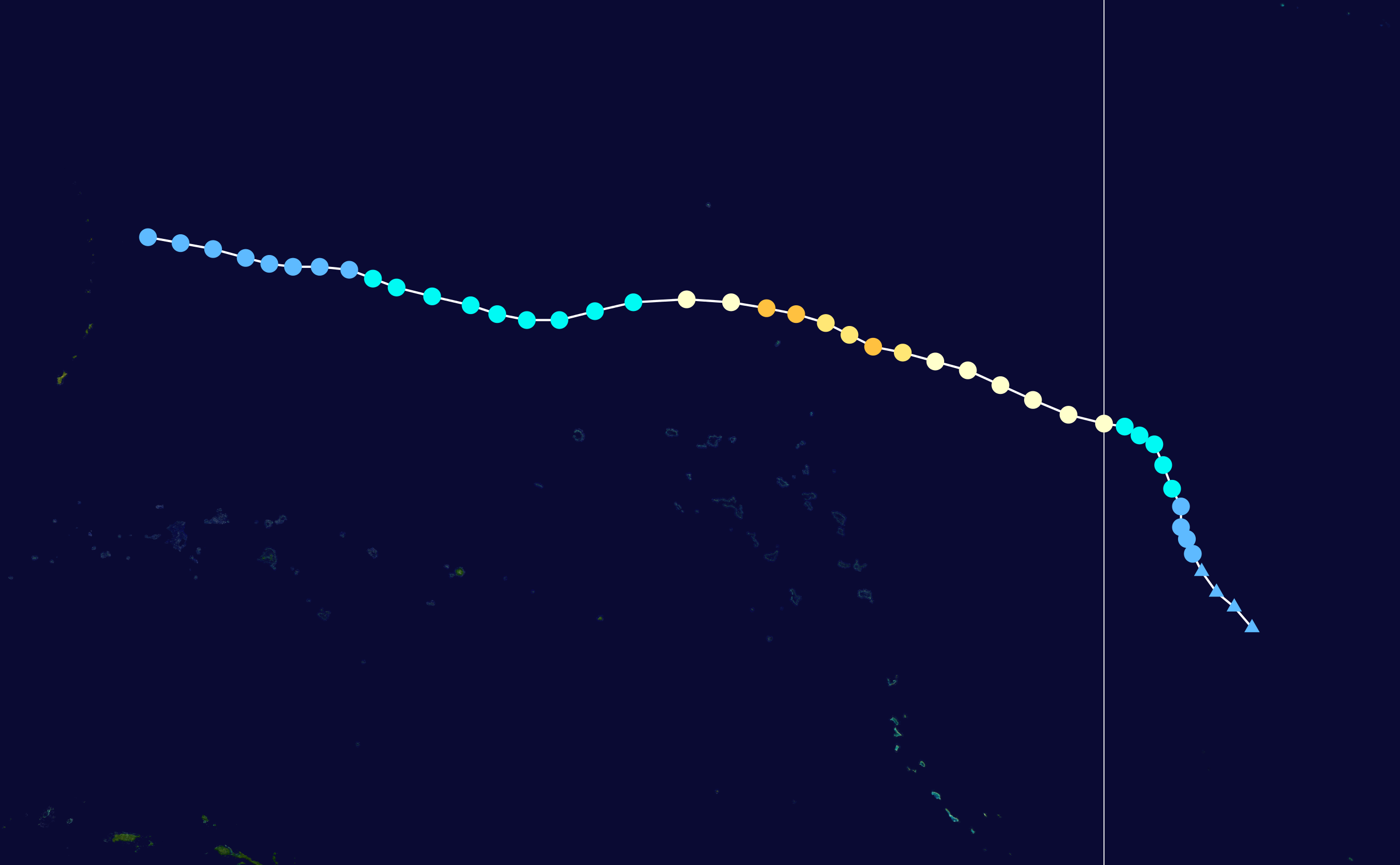
- Duration: November 14 – November 21
- Peak intensity: 205 km/h (125 mph) (1-min); 940 hPa (mbar)

=== Typhoon Sally ===
- Typhoon (JMA)
- Category 1-equivalent typhoon (SSHWS)
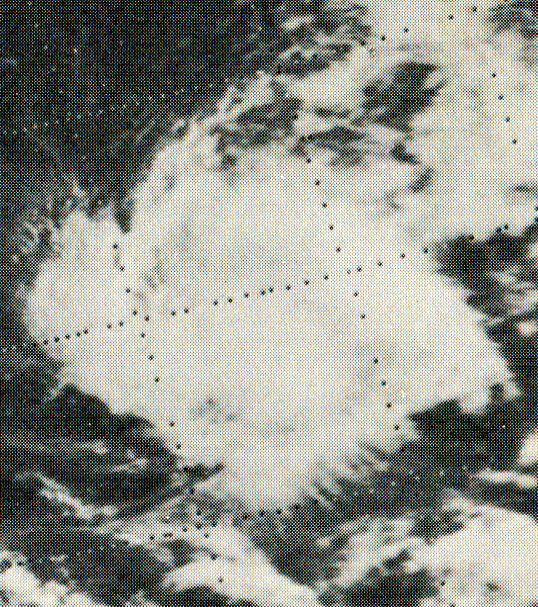
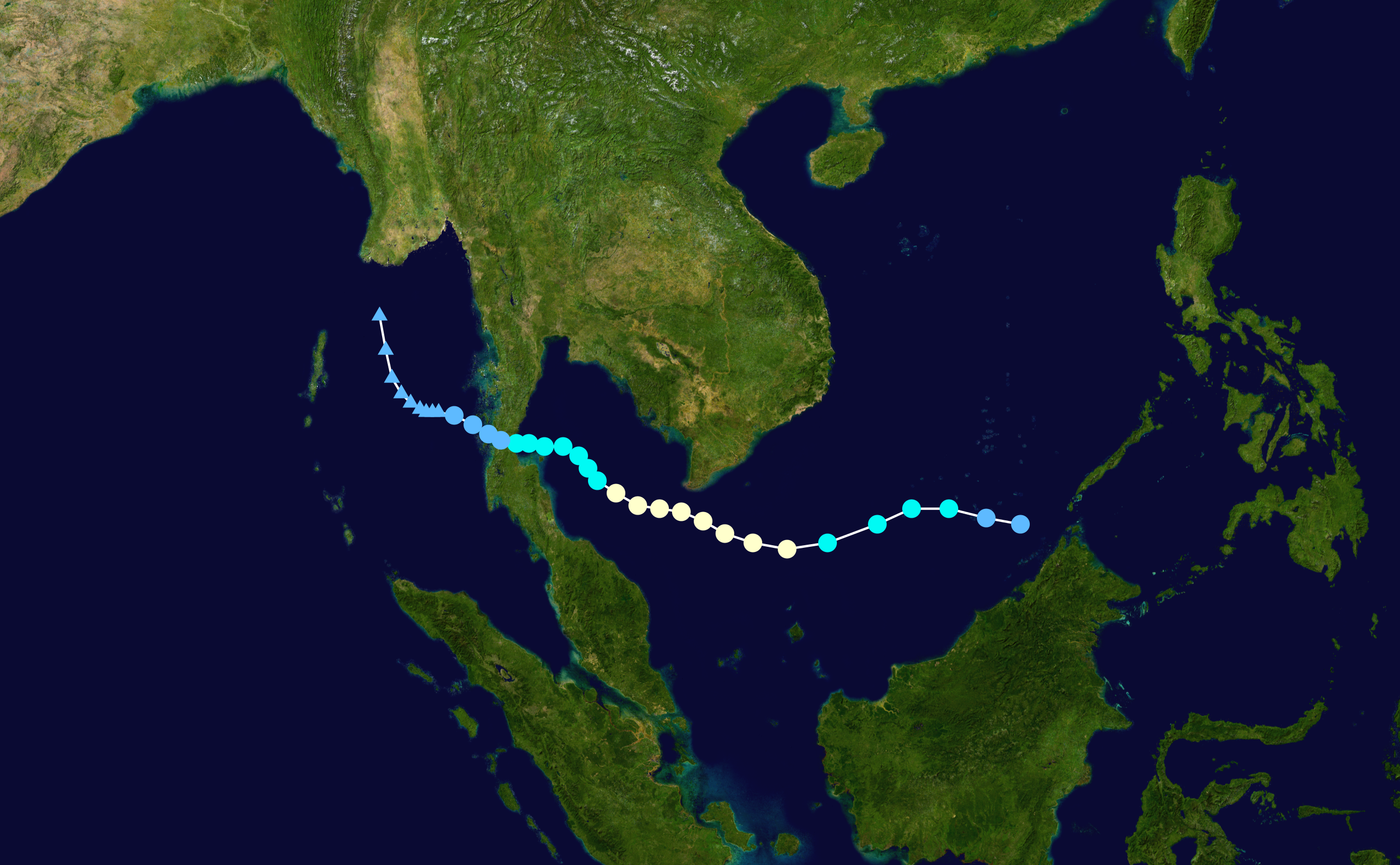
- Duration: November 30 – December 4
- Peak intensity: 150 km/h (90 mph) (1-min); 985 hPa (mbar)

On November 30, a low-pressure area formed near Borneo, before moving westwards towards the Gulf Of Thailand and eventually becoming Typhoon Sally. Typhoon Sally made landfall near the Surat Thani province of Thailand and gradually weakened to a remnant low in the Bay of Bengal on December 2, dissipating in the same area.

=== Typhoon Therese (Undang) ===
- Typhoon (JMA)
- Category 3-equivalent typhoon (SSHWS)
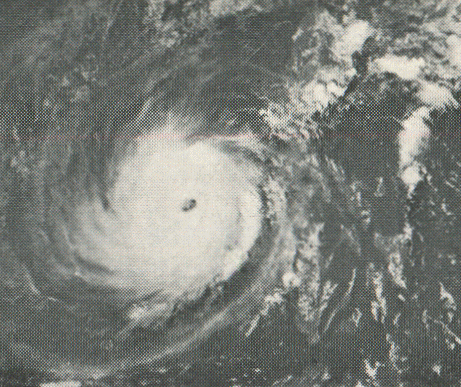
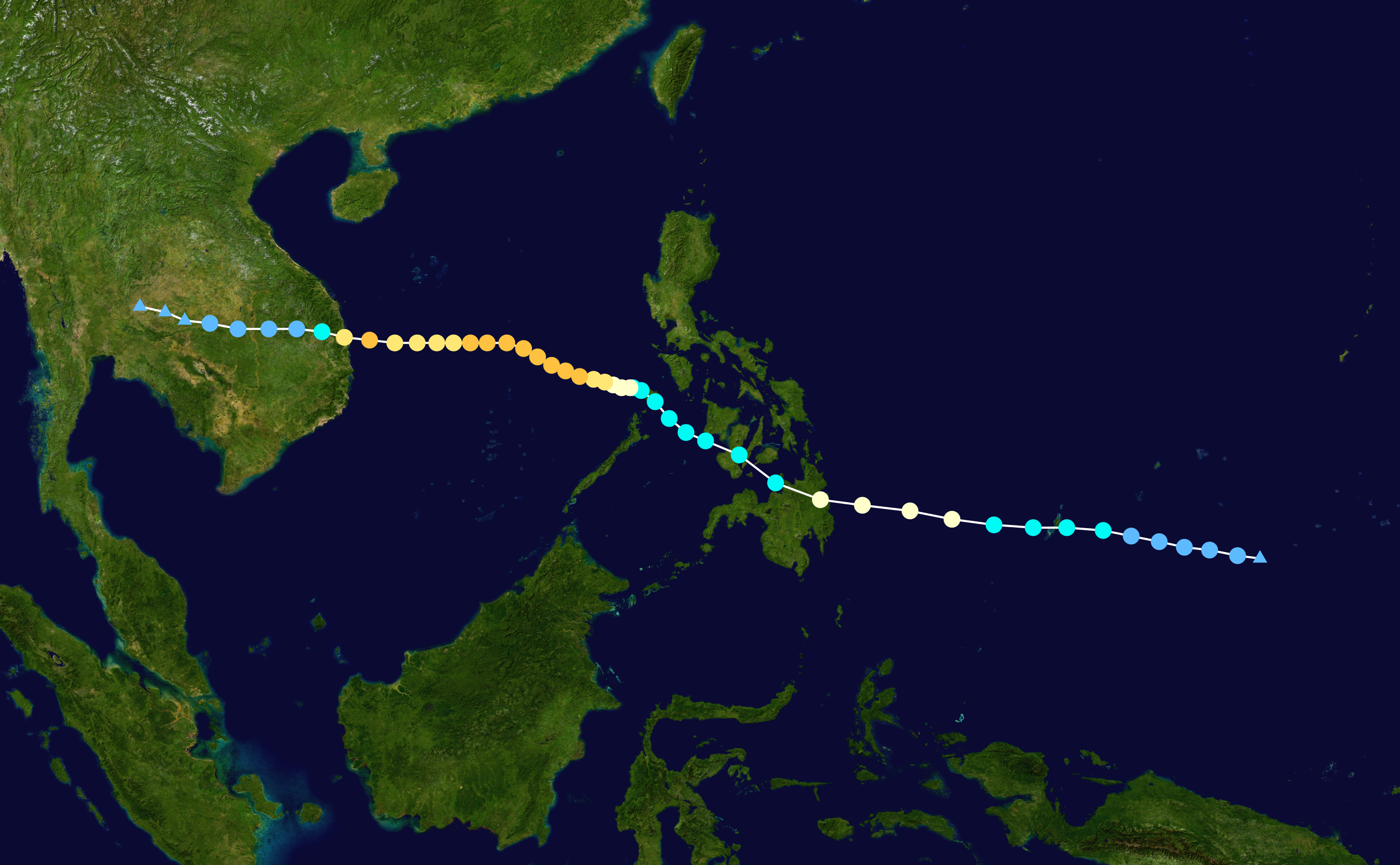
- Duration: December 1 – December 11
- Peak intensity: 195 km/h (120 mph) (1-min); 945 hPa (mbar)

Typhoon Therese developed on November 30, struck the Philippines on December 3. After crossing the islands, the typhoon reached a peak of 120 mph (190 km/h) winds in the South China Sea, a rare event for December. Therese's intensity fluctuated as it continued westward, and hit eastern South Vietnam on the 9th as a 115 mph (185 km/h) typhoon. Therese dissipated on the 12th, after causing 90 deaths and extensive damage on its path.

=== Severe Tropical Storm Violet ===
- Severe tropical storm (JMA)
- Tropical storm (SSHWS)
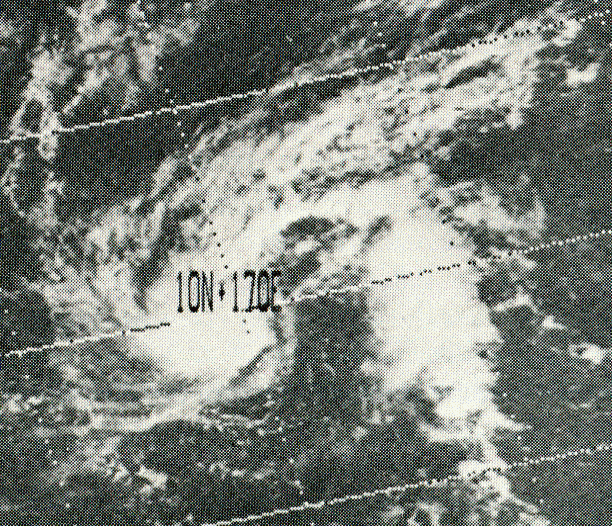
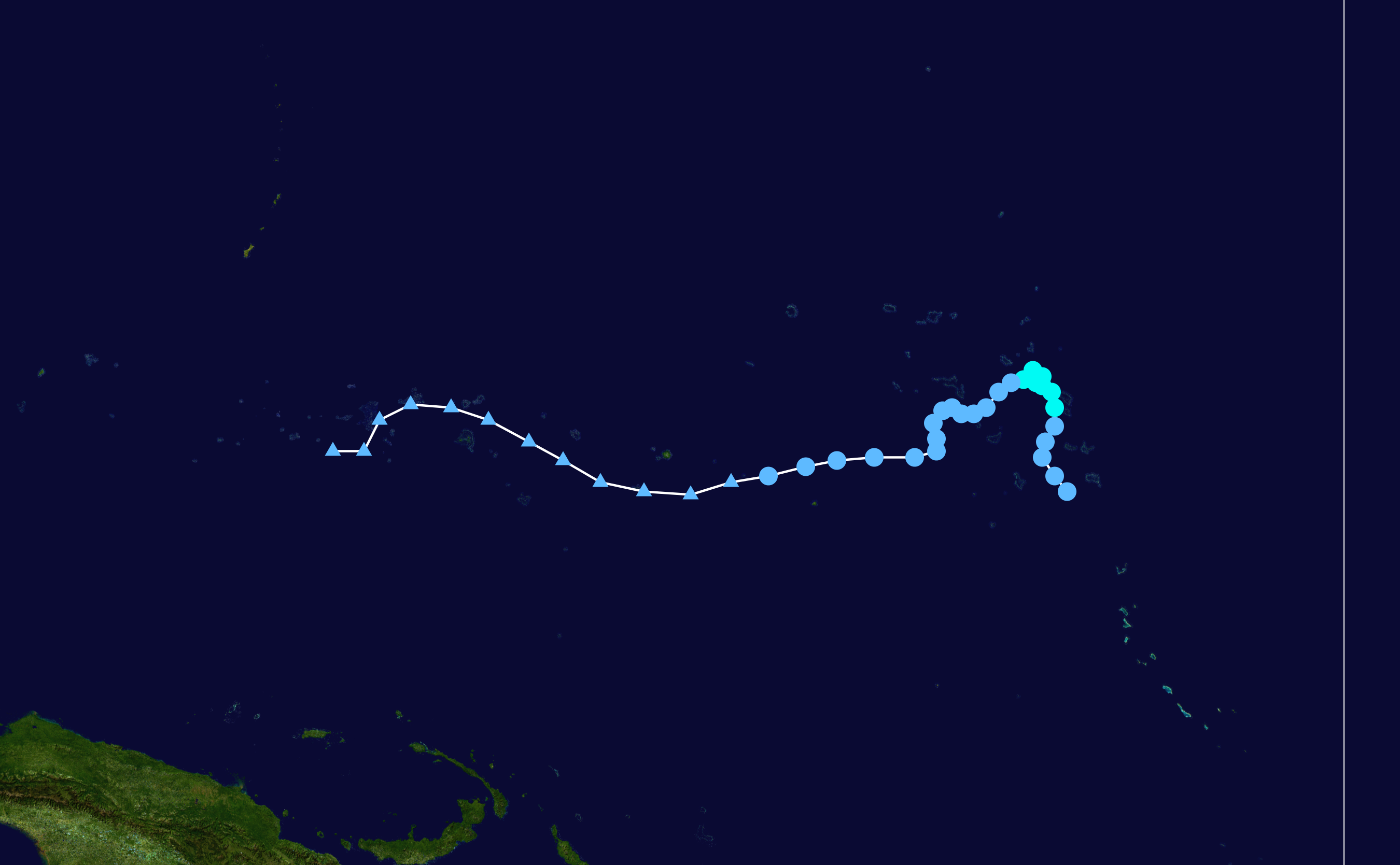
- Duration: December 12 – December 21
- Peak intensity: 100 km/h (65 mph) (1-min); 995 hPa (mbar)

== Storm names ==
During the season 29 named tropical cyclones developed in the Western Pacific and were named by the Joint Typhoon Warning Center, when it was determined that they had become tropical storms. These names were contributed to a revised list from late 1950.

Kit	Lola	Mamie	Nina	Ora	Phyllis	Rita	Susan	Tess	Viola	Winnie	Alice	Betty	Cora	Doris
Elsie	Flossie	Grace	Helen	Ida	Kathy	Lorna	Marie	Nancy	Olga	Pamela	Sally	Therese	Violet	

Two Central Pacific system developed, Tropical Storms June and Ruby. The naming policy at the time was to use Western Pacific names the Central Pacific.

=== Philippines ===
Asiang	Biring	Konsing	Didang	Edeng
Gloring	Huaning	Isang	Lusing	Maring
Nitang	Osang	Paring	Reming	Seniang
Toyang	Undang	Welpring (unused)	Yoning (unused)	
Auxiliary list
				Aring (unused)
Basiang (unused)	Kayang (unused)	Dorang (unused)	Enang (unused)	Grasing (unused)

The Philippine Atmospheric, Geophysical and Astronomical Services Administration uses its own naming scheme for tropical cyclones in their area of responsibility. PAGASA assigns names to tropical depressions that form within their area of responsibility and any tropical cyclone that might move into their area of responsibility. Should the list of names for a given year prove to be insufficient, names are taken from an auxiliary list, the first 6 of which are published each year before the season starts. Names not retired from this list will be used again in the 1976 season. This is the same list used for the 1968 season. PAGASA uses its own naming scheme that starts in the Filipino alphabet, with names of Filipino female names ending with "ng" (A, B, K, D, etc.). Names that were not assigned/going to use are marked in gray.

== Season effects ==
This table will list all the storms that developed in the northwestern Pacific Ocean west of the International Date Line and north of the equator during 1972. It will include their intensity, duration, name, areas affected, deaths, missing persons (in parentheses), and damage totals. Classification and intensity values will be based on estimations conducted by the JMA, however due to lack of information around this time sustained winds were recorded by the JTWC. All damage figures will be in 1972 USD. Damages and deaths from a storm will include when the storm was a precursor wave or an extratropical low.

Name	Dates	Peak intensity			Areas affected	Damage (USD)	Deaths	Ref(s).
Name	Dates	Category	Wind speed	Pressure	Areas affected	Damage (USD)	Deaths	Ref(s).
Kit (Asiang-Biring)	January 4–5	Typhoon	220 km/h (135 mph)	940 hPa (27.76 inHg)	Palau, Philippines	$23 million	204	
TD	January 4–5	Tropical depression	Not specified	1,004 hPa (29.65 inHg)	None	None	None	
TD	February 28 – March 4	Tropical depression	Not specified	1,002 hPa (29.59 inHg)	Palau, Mariana Islands	None	None	
TD	March 2–4	Tropical depression	Not specified	1,008 hPa (29.77 inHg)	None	None	None	
TD	March 2–4	Tropical depression	Not specified	1,006 hPa (29.71 inHg)	Mariana Islands	None	None	
02W	April 2–6	Tropical depression	55 km/h (35 mph)	1,004 hPa (29.65 inHg)	None	None	None	
TD	May 21–24	Tropical depression	Not specified	1,006 hPa (29.71 inHg)	None	None	None	
TD	May 25–28	Tropical depression	Not specified	1,006 hPa (29.71 inHg)	Mariana Islands	None	None	
Lola	May 27 – June 8	Typhoon	195 km/h (120 mph)	955 hPa (28.20 inHg)	Caroline Islands	$18,000	None	
Nina	June 1–7	Tropical storm	95 km/h (60 mph)	990 hPa (29.23 inHg)	Caroline Islands	None	None	
Mamie	June 1–4	Tropical storm	85 km/h (55 mph)	996 hPa (29.41 inHg)	Vietnam, South China	None	None	
TD	June 1	Tropical depression	Not specified	1,008 hPa (29.77 inHg)	None	None	None	
TD	June 10–13	Tropical depression	Not specified	1,000 hPa (29.53 inHg)	South China, Taiwan, Ryukyu Islands	None	None	
TD	June 10	Tropical depression	Not specified	1,006 hPa (29.71 inHg)	None	None	None	
Ora (Konsing)	June 22–27	Typhoon	150 km/h (95 mph)	980 hPa (28.94 inHg)	Philippines, South China	$15 million	131	
Didang	June 28–30	Tropical depression	Not specified	Not specified	None	None	None	
Phyllis	July 4–15	Typhoon	220 km/h (135 mph)	945 hPa (27.91 inHg)	Japan	Unknown	3	
Rita (Gloring)	July 5–27	Typhoon	270 km/h (170 mph)	910 hPa (26.87 inHg)	Caroline Islands, Ryukyu Islands, South China	$445 million	377	
Susan (Edeng)	July 5–15	Typhoon	120 km/h (75 mph)	980 hPa (28.94 inHg)	Philippines, Taiwan, China	Unknown	218	
Tess	July 7–25	Typhoon	230 km/h (145 mph)	940 hPa (27.76 inHg)	Japan, Korean Peninsula	Unknown	29	
Viola	July 5–15	Typhoon	110 km/h (70 mph)	975 hPa (28.79 inHg)	None	None	None	
Eleven	July 25–30	Tropical storm	Not specified	990 hPa (29.23 inHg)	None	None	None	
TD	July 25–27	Tropical depression	Not specified	1,000 hPa (29.53 inHg)	None	None	None	
Alice	July 28 – August 9	Typhoon	165 km/h (105 mph)	965 hPa (28.50 inHg)	Japan	None	None	
Winnie (Isang)	July 25–30	Tropical storm	110 km/h (70 mph)	990 hPa (29.23 inHg)	Taiwan, Ryukyu Islands, East China	None	None	
Huaning	July 29–30	Tropical depression	45 km/h (30 mph)	998 hPa (29.47 inHg)	Taiwan	None	None	
TD	July 30 – August 3	Tropical depression	Not specified	998 hPa (29.47 inHg)	South China	None	None	
TD	July 31 – August 7	Tropical depression	Not specified	1,004 hPa (29.65 inHg)	Mariana Islands	None	None	
Betty (Maring)	August 8–18	Typhoon	250 km/h (155 mph)	910 hPa (26.87 inHg)	Mariana Islands, Taiwan, Ryukyu Islands, East China	Unknown	29	
Lusing	August 10	Tropical depression	45 km/h (30 mph)	1,004 hPa (29.65 inHg)	None	None	None	
TD	August 21–23	Tropical depression	Not specified	1,004 hPa (29.65 inHg)	Philippines	None	None	
TD	August 21	Tropical depression	Not specified	1,008 hPa (29.77 inHg)	None	None	None	
TD	August 22–24	Tropical depression	Not specified	1,006 hPa (29.71 inHg)	Mariana Islands	None	None	
Celeste	August 24	Tropical depression	Not specified	1,012 hPa (29.88 inHg)	Wake Island	None	None	
Cora	August 24–29	Typhoon	120 km/h (75 mph)	975 hPa (28.79 inHg)	Philippines, South China	Unknown	None	
Doris	August 25–29	Severe tropical storm	100 km/h (60 mph)	985 hPa (29.09 inHg)	None	None	None	
Elsie	August 31 – September 7	Typhoon	140 km/h (85 mph)	975 hPa (28.79 inHg)	Indochina	Unknown	None	
TD	September 1–10	Tropical depression	Not specified	998 hPa (29.47 inHg)	Ryukyu Islands, Japan	None	None	
TD	September 4–5	Tropical depression	Not specified	1,004 hPa (29.65 inHg)	None	None	None	
TD	September 6	Tropical depression	Not specified	1,008 hPa (29.77 inHg)	Ryukyu Islands	None	None	
Flossie (Nitang)	September 7–18	Typhoon	140 km/h (85 mph)	975 hPa (28.79 inHg)	Philippines, Indochina	Unknown	None	
TD	September 7	Tropical depression	Not specified	1,006 hPa (29.71 inHg)	Caroline Islands	None	None	
Helen (Paring)	September 10–18	Typhoon	185 km/h (115 mph)	955 hPa (28.20 inHg)	Japan	$102 million	87	
Grace (Osang)	September 11–14	Tropical storm	95 km/h (60 mph)	990 hPa (29.23 inHg)	Philippines	None	None	
21W	September 13–19	Tropical depression	55 km/h (35 mph)	1,000 hPa (29.53 inHg)	Caroline Islands	None	None	
TD	September 15	Tropical depression	Not specified	1,004 hPa (29.65 inHg)	Caroline Islands	None	None	
Reming	September 16–20	Tropical depression	45 km/h (30 mph)	1,004 hPa (29.65 inHg)	Philippines	None	None	
Ida	September 16–26	Typhoon	205 km/h (125 mph)	930 hPa (27.46 inHg)	None	None	None	
Lorna	September 27 – October 3	Typhoon	140 km/h (85 mph)	990 hPa (29.23 inHg)	South China, Vietnam	None	None	
Kathy	September 27 – October 6	Typhoon	110 km/h (70 mph)	980 hPa (28.94 inHg)	None	None	None	
Marie	October 5–12	Typhoon	215 km/h (135 mph)	935 hPa (27.61 inHg)	None	None	None	
TD	October 9–12	Tropical depression	Not specified	1,004 hPa (29.65 inHg)	None	None	None	
Seniang	October 13–20	Tropical depression	55 km/h (35 mph)	1,004 hPa (29.65 inHg)	Palau, Philippines	None	None	
Nancy	October 16–26	Typhoon	195 km/h (120 mph)	945 hPa (27.91 inHg)	None	None	None	
Olga	October 21–30	Typhoon	195 km/h (120 mph)	940 hPa (27.76 inHg)	Marshall Islands, Mariana Islands	None	None	
TD	October 31	Tropical depression	Not specified	1,012 hPa (29.88 inHg)	Philippines	None	None	
TD	October 31 – November 2	Tropical depression	Not specified	1,004 hPa (29.65 inHg)	None	None	None	
Pamela (Toyang)	November 2–9	Typhoon	205 km/h (125 mph)	940 hPa (27.76 inHg)	Philippines, South China	Unknown	1	
Ruby	November 14–21	Typhoon	205 km/h (125 mph)	940 hPa (27.76 inHg)	None	None	None	
TD	November 16–27	Tropical depression	Not specified	1,008 hPa (29.77 inHg)	Caroline Islands	None	None	
Sally	November 30 – December 4	Typhoon	150 km/h (95 mph)	985 hPa (29.09 inHg)	Thailand	Unknown	Unknown	
Therese (Undang)	December 1–11	Typhoon	195 km/h (120 mph)	945 hPa (27.91 inHg)	Philippines, Vietnam	Unknown	90	
Violet	December 12–21	Severe tropical storm	100 km/h (60 mph)	994 hPa (29.35 inHg)	Marshall Islands	None	None	
Season aggregates
63 systems	January 4 – December 21, 1972		270 km/h (170 mph)	910 hPa (26.87 inHg)		>$585 million	>1,169	

== See also ==
- 1972 Pacific hurricane season
- 1972 Atlantic hurricane season
- 1972 North Indian Ocean cyclone season
- Australian cyclone seasons: 1971–72, 1972–73
- South Pacific cyclone seasons: 1971–72, 1972–73
- South-West Indian Ocean cyclone seasons: 1971–72, 1972–73
