= List of storms named Pining =

The name Pining has been used for eight tropical cyclones in the Western Pacific Ocean, all named by either the Philippine Atmospheric, Geophysical and Astronomical Services Administration (PAGASA) or its predecessor, the Philippine Weather Bureau:

- Typhoon Ivy (1965) (T6514, 18W, Pining) – executed a loop and only survived 5 days before dissipating.
- Typhoon June (1969) (T6917, 20W, Pining) – remained over open waters.
- Tropical Storm Freda (1977) (T7713, 14W, Pining) – a strong but short-lived tropical storm which struck Hong Kong.
- Typhoon Agnes (1981) (T8118, 18W, Pining) – a Category 2-equivalent typhoon that caused severe flooding in South Korea.
- Typhoon Brenda (1985) (T8518, 22W, Pining) – a Category 2-equivalent typhoon that caused minor damages in Japan, Taiwan and South Korea.
- Tropical Storm Vera (1989) (T8921, 24W, Pining) – a strong tropical storm that caused widespread flooding throughout Eastern China.
- Tropical Storm Steve (1993) (T9308, 14W, Pining) – remained over open waters.
- Tropical Storm Mort (1997) (T9727, 31W, Pining) – a weak tropical storm that brought locally heavy rainfall to areas of northern Luzon, resulting in minor flooding.

== See also ==
- List of storms named Bining – a similar name that has also been used in the Western Pacific Ocean.
