= List of storms named Bining =

The name Bining has been used for nine tropical cyclones in the Western Pacific Ocean, all named by either the Philippine Weather Bureau (before December 1972) or its successor Philippine Atmospheric, Geophysical and Astronomical Services Administration (PAGASA; after December 1972):

- Typhoon Patsy (1965) (T6501, 01W, Bining) – an early-season typhoon that impacted the Philippines.
- Tropical Depression Bining (1969) – a short-lived early season disturbance that was only monitored by PAGASA.
- Typhoon Billie (1973) (T7303, 04W, Bining) – a strong typhoon which brushed the Philippine and Taiwanese coasts before striking northeast China.
- Tropical Depression 02W (1977) – a weak tropical depression that remained short-lived.
- Tropical Storm Ike (1981) (T8104, 04W, Bining) – a strong tropical storm which affected Hong Kong, the Philippines and Taiwan, producing moderate damage.
- Typhoon Gay (1985) (T8503, 03W, Bining) – a powerful early-season typhoon that did not impact land.
- Typhoon Brenda (1989) (T8903, 03W, Bining) – a typhoon which crossed the Philippines and China, killing at least 104 people.
- Tropical Depression 03W (1993) – a weak system that made landfall in Mindanao, causing minimal damage.
- Tropical Storm Levi (1997) (T9704, 05W, Bining) – a tropical storm which impacted the Philippines, claiming 53 lives and inflicting significant damage.

== See also ==
Similar names that have also been used for tropical cyclones:

- List of storms named Binang – also used in the Western Pacific Ocean.
- Typhoon Bing (1997) – a Category 4-equivalent Western Pacific super typhoon.
- List of storms named Biring – also used in the Western Pacific Ocean.
- List of storms named Bising – also used in the Western Pacific Ocean.
- List of storms named Pining – also used in the Western Pacific Ocean.
