= List of storms named Biring =

The name Biring has been used for ten tropical cyclones in the Western Pacific Ocean. All storms were named in the Philippine Area of Responsibility by the Philippine Weather Bureau (before December 1972) and its successor PAGASA (after December 1972):

- Tropical Depression Biring (1964)
- Typhoon Kim (1968) (196802, 03W, Biring) – a Category 3-equivalent typhoon
- Typhoon Kit (1972) (197201, 01W, Asiang–Biring) – a Category 4-equivalent typhoon that killed 204 people and caused approximately $23 million (1972 USD) in damages in the Philippines
- Tropical Depression Biring (1976)
- Tropical Depression 01W (1980) (Biring)
- Typhoon Alex (1984) (198403, 03W, Biring) – a Category 1-equivalent typhoon
- Typhoon Susan (1988) (198802, 02W, Biring) – killed six people in the Philippines
- Tropical Storm Deanna (1992) (04W, Biring) – caused Tropical Cyclone Wind Signal #1 to be raised in Batanes and Cagayan
- Tropical Storm Ann (1996) (199602, 02W, Biring)
- Tropical Storm Longwang (2000) (200002, 02W, Biring)

== See also ==
Similar names used for other tropical cyclones:

- List of storms named Bining – also used in the Western Pacific Ocean
- List of storms named Bising – also used in the Western Pacific Ocean
- Severe Tropical Storm Melor (2003) (T0319, 24W, Viring) – A Category 1 typhoon that had a similar PAGASA name; affected the Philippines, Taiwan and Japan
