= 1977 Pacific typhoon season =

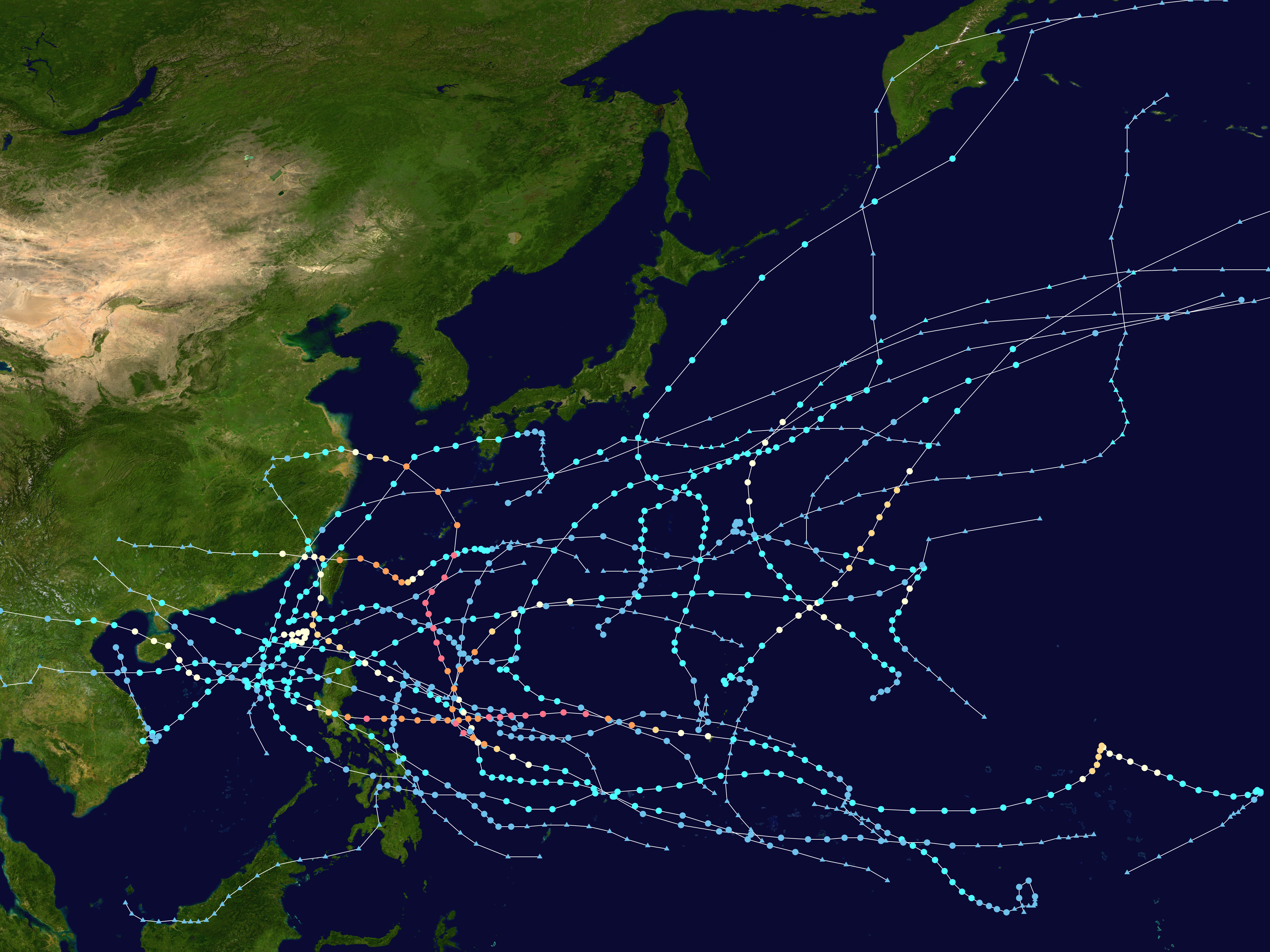
- Season summary map

Seasonal boundaries
- First system formed: January 10, 1977
- Last system dissipated: January 3, 1978

Strongest storm
- Name: Babe
  - Maximum winds: 205 km/h (125 mph) (10-minute sustained)
  - Lowest pressure: 905 hPa (mbar)

Seasonal statistics
- Total depressions: 54
- Total storms: 21
- Typhoons: 11
- Very strong typhoons: 5
- Violent typhoons: 4
- Total fatalities: >309
- Total damage: > $654.04 million (1977 USD)

Related articles
- 1977 Atlantic hurricane season; 1977 Pacific hurricane season; 1977 North Indian Ocean cyclone season

The 1977 Pacific typhoon season was one of the least active Pacific typhoon seasons on record, with only 21 tropical storms forming. It was also the second of three known typhoon seasons during the satellite era (since 1960) to not produce a Category 5-equivalent super typhoon, sandwiched between the 1974 and 2017 seasons. The season's first storm, Severe Tropical Storm Patsy, formed on March 23 and the last, Typhoon Mary, dissipated on January 2, 1978. With Mary spanning two calendar years, it became the fourth typhoon to do so since 1945. Since then, two other typhoons have achieved this feat.

The scope of this article is limited to the Pacific Ocean, north of the equator and west of the International Date Line. Storms that form east of the date line and north of the equator are called hurricanes; see 1977 Pacific hurricane season. Tropical Storms formed in the entire west pacific basin were assigned a name by the Joint Typhoon Warning Center. Tropical depressions in this basin have the "W" suffix added to their number. Tropical depressions that enter or form in the Philippine area of responsibility are assigned a name by the Philippine Atmospheric, Geophysical and Astronomical Services Administration or PAGASA. This can often result in the same storm having two names.

== Systems ==
A total of 54 tropical depressions were recognized by the various warning agencies this year in the Western Pacific, of which 20 became tropical storms. Eleven storms reached typhoon intensity, of which three reached super typhoon strength.

=== Tropical Depression Atring ===
- Tropical depression (PAGASA)
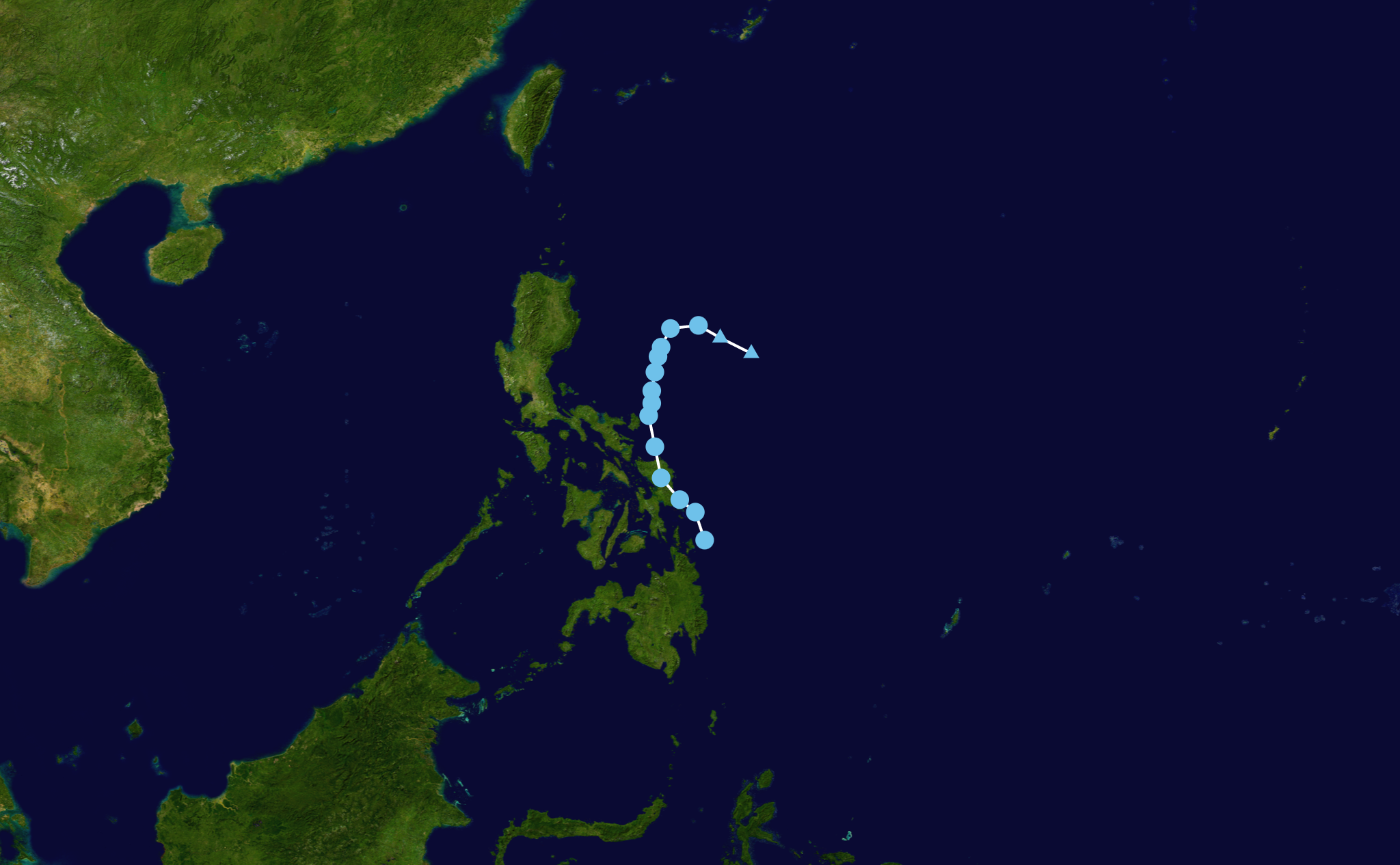
- Duration: January 10 – January 13
- Peak intensity: 55 km/h (35 mph) (10-min);

Tropical Depression Atring formed in the western Pacific Ocean in 1977. It did not intensify into a tropical storm and dissipated shortly after formation. The storm had minimal impact on land and did not cause significant damage or loss of life.

=== Severe Tropical Storm Patsy ===
- Severe tropical storm (JMA)
- Tropical storm (SSHWS)
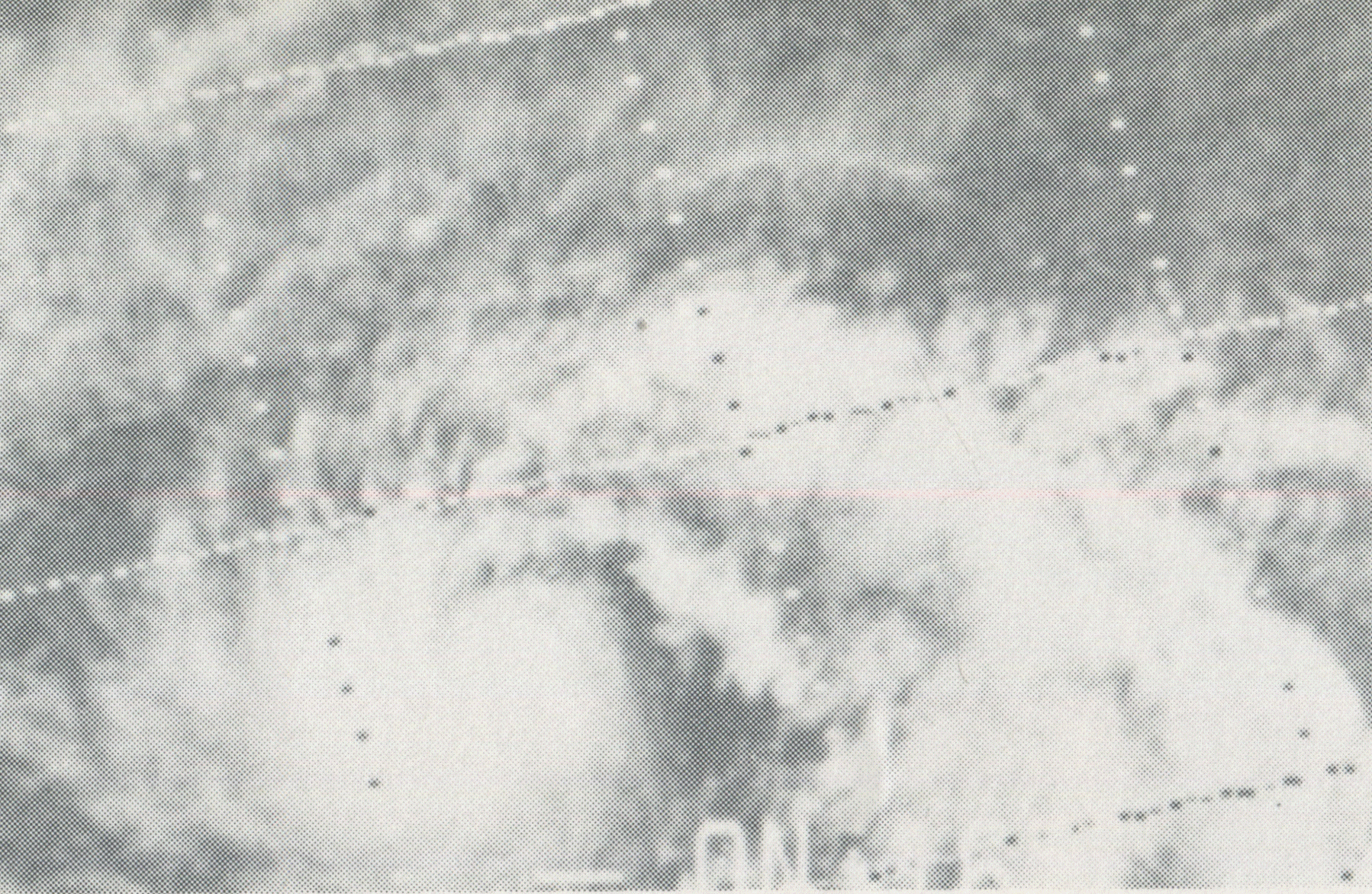
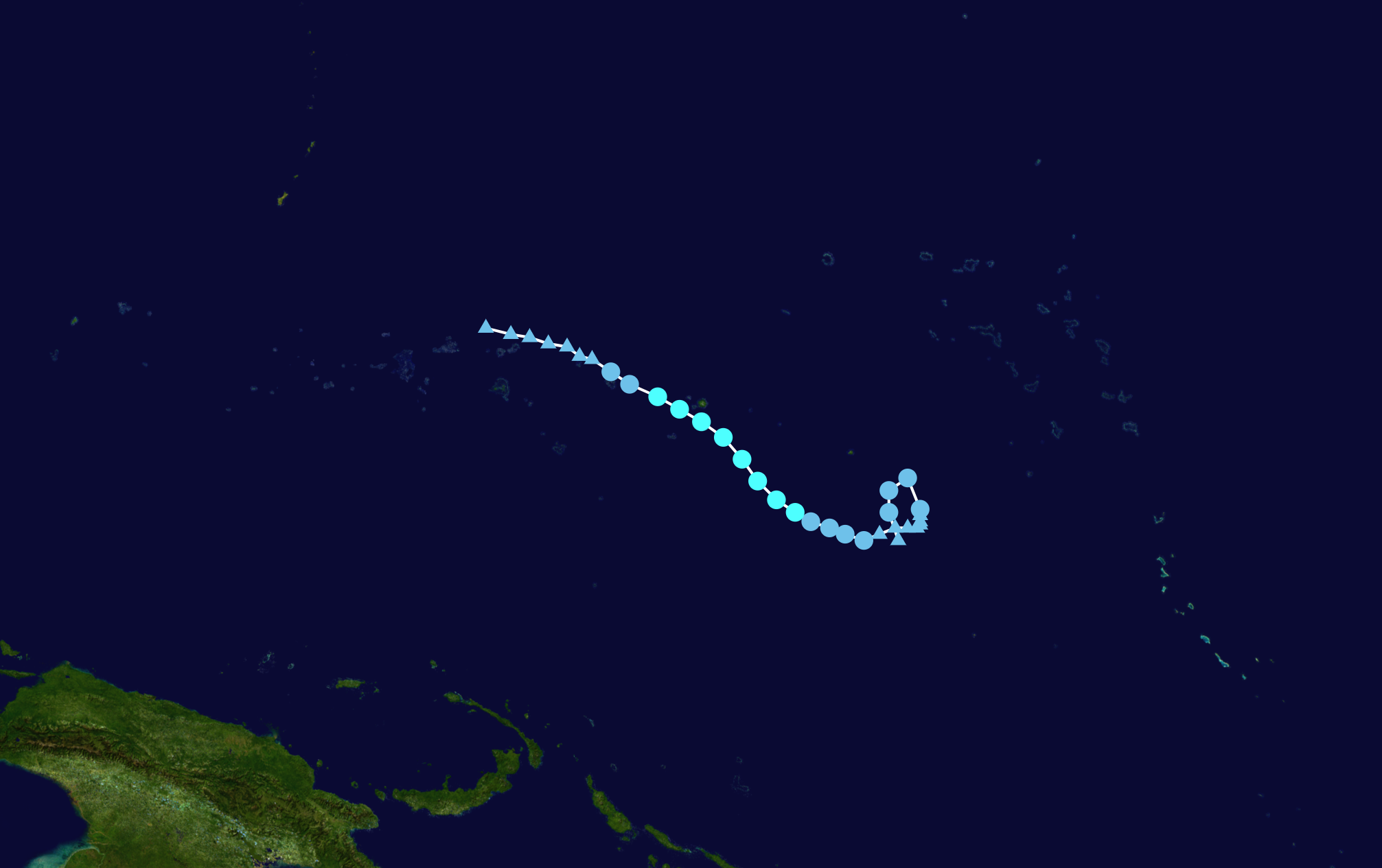
- Duration: March 23 – March 31
- Peak intensity: 95 km/h (60 mph) (10-min); 990 hPa (mbar)

Severe Tropical Storm Patsy formed in the western Pacific Ocean in 1977. It reached peak intensity with 60 mph winds and a minimum pressure of 990 hPa. While relatively weak, Patsy brought heavy rain and strong winds to parts of the Philippines and Taiwan, causing localized flooding and property damage. The storm weakened rapidly after making landfall in Taiwan and dissipated over the island.

=== Tropical Depression 02W (Bining) ===
- Tropical depression (PAGASA)
- Tropical depression (SSHWS)
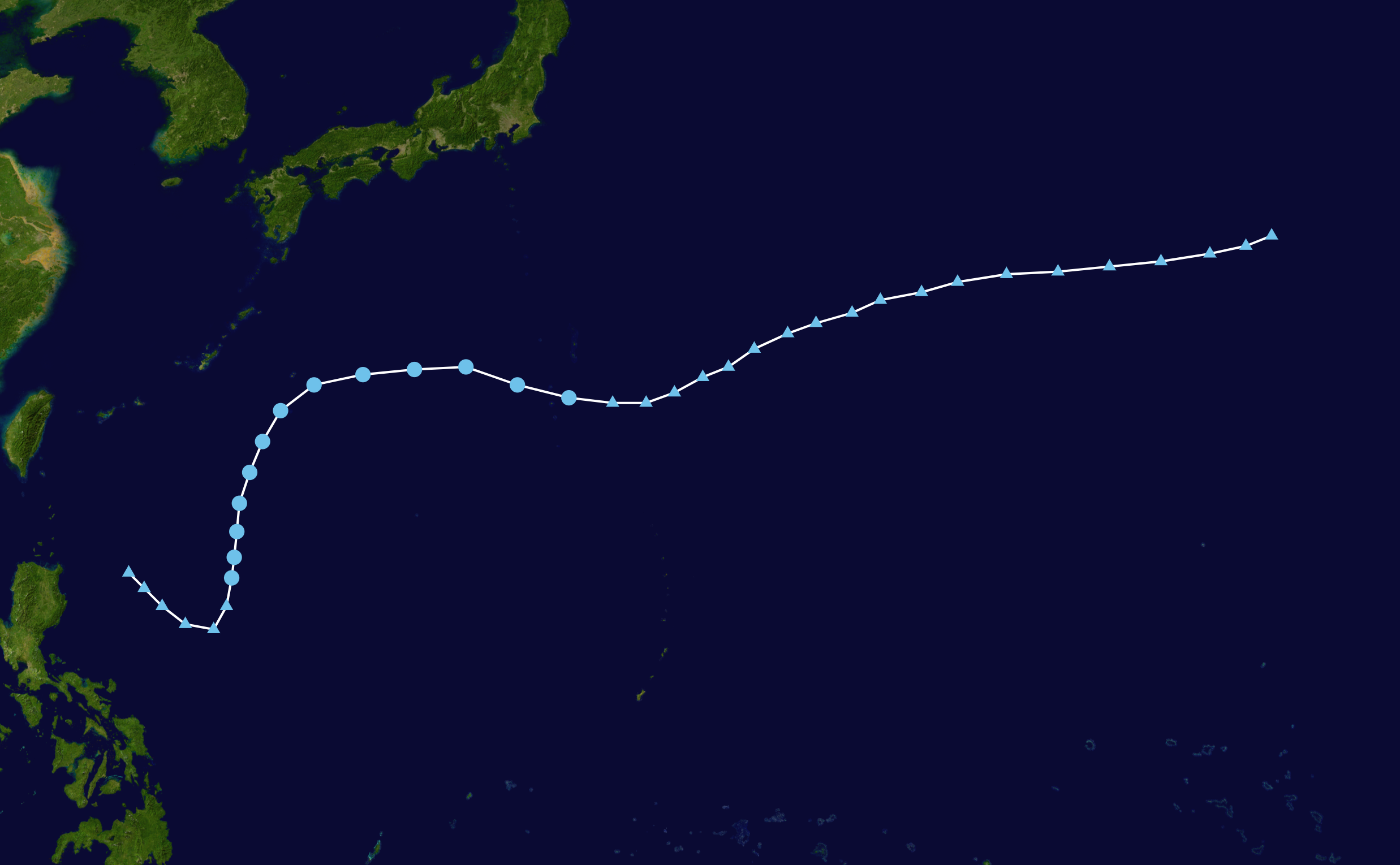
- Duration: May 26 – May 27
- Peak intensity: 55 km/h (35 mph) (1-min); 1000 hPa (mbar)

Tropical Depression 02W (Bining) in 1977 was a weak tropical depression that formed in the western Pacific Ocean. It did not intensify into a tropical storm and dissipated shortly after formation. The storm had minimal impact on land and did not cause significant damage or loss of life.

=== Tropical Storm Ruth (Kuring) ===
- Severe tropical storm (JMA)
- Tropical storm (SSHWS)
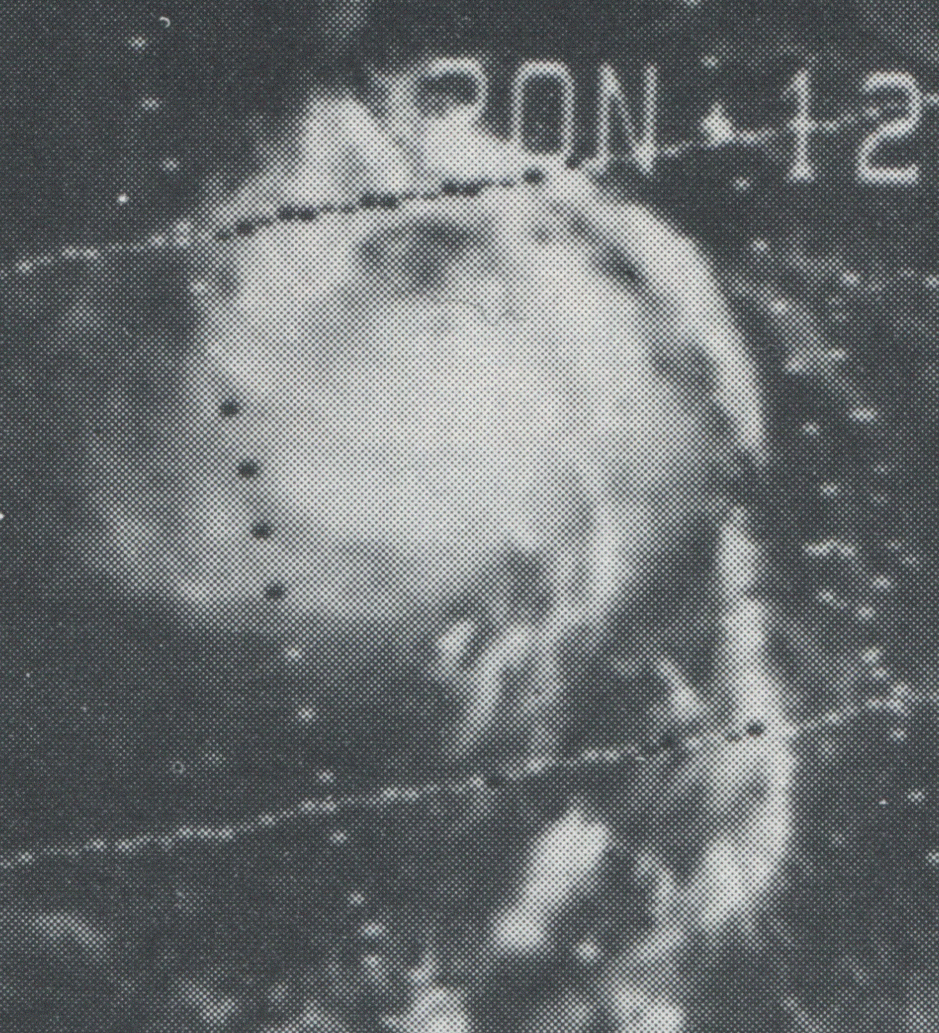
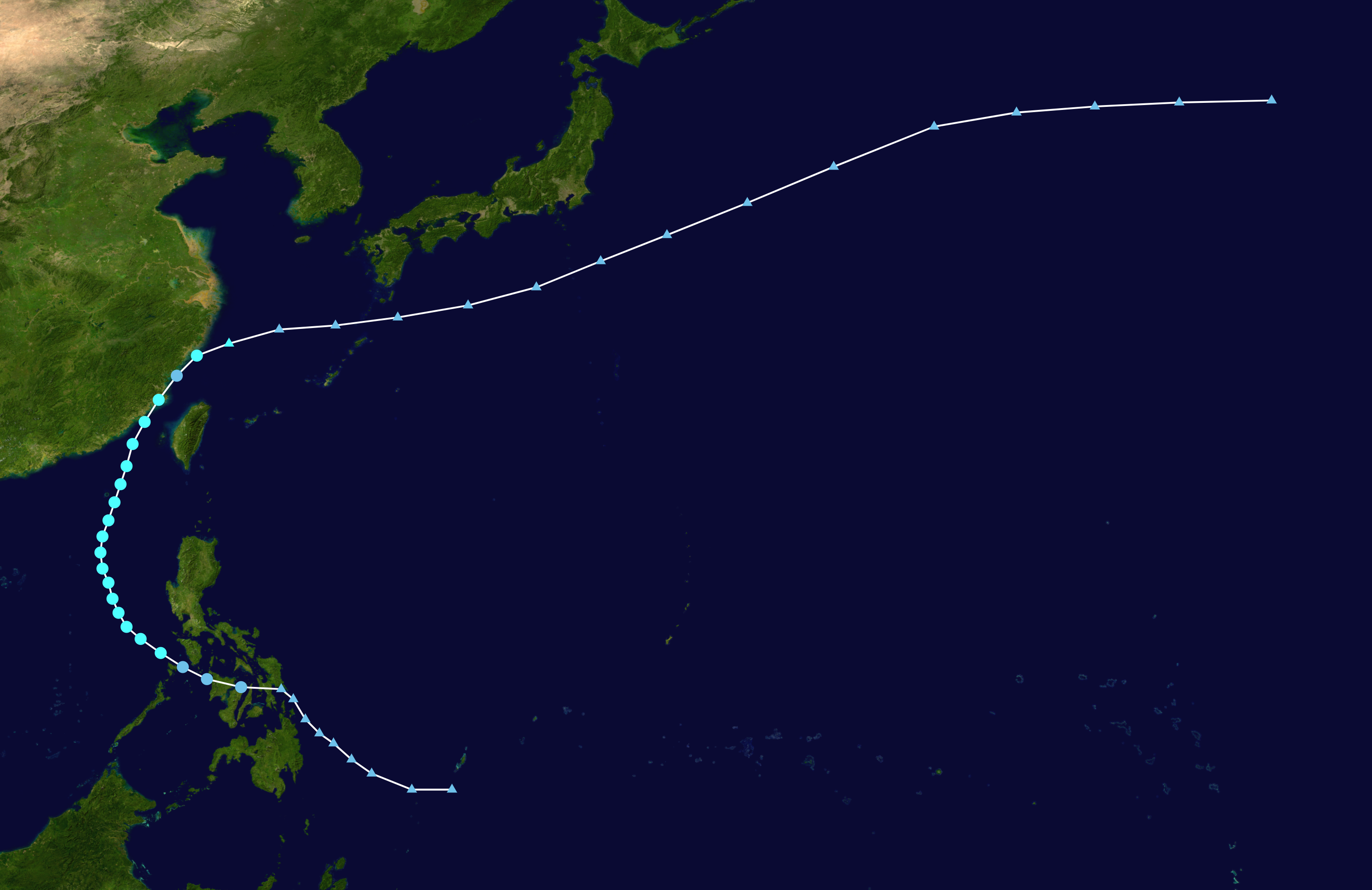
- Duration: June 14 – June 17
- Peak intensity: 110 km/h (70 mph) (10-min); 975 hPa (mbar)

Tropical Storm Ruth (Kuring) battered the Philippines in 1977, primarily affecting Luzon. The storm caused significant damage to homes and infrastructure, displacing thousands of people and resulting in fatalities. Its impact underscores the destructive power of tropical cyclones in the region.

=== Tropical Depression 04W (Daling) ===
- Tropical depression (PAGASA)
- Tropical depression (SSHWS)
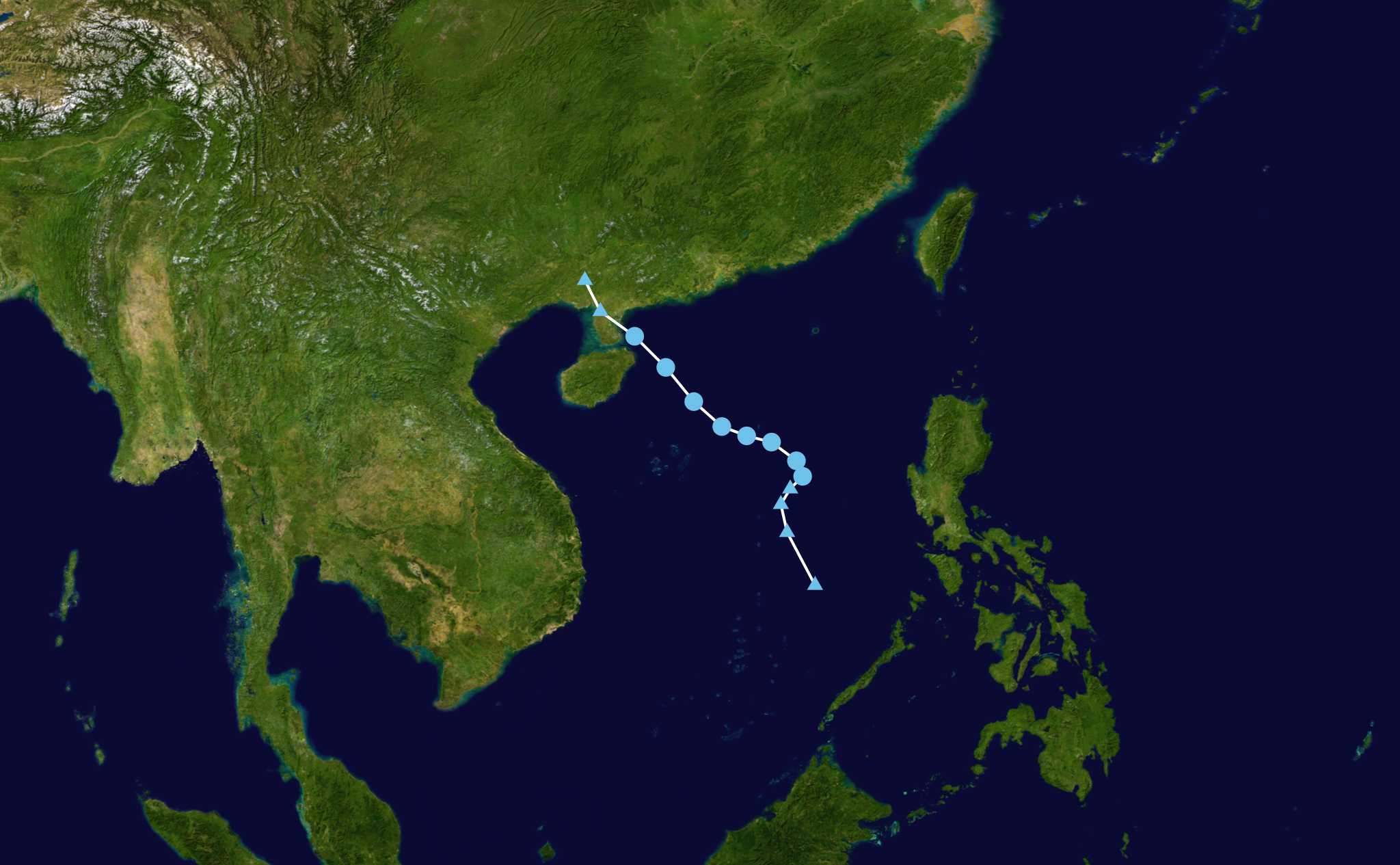
- Duration: July 5 – July 6
- Peak intensity: 55 km/h (35 mph) (1-min); 995 hPa (mbar)

Tropical Depression 04W (Daling) formed in the western Pacific Ocean in 1977. It was a short-lived system that did not intensify into a tropical storm and dissipated shortly after formation. The storm had minimal impact on land and did not cause significant damage or loss of life.

=== Typhoon Sarah (Elang) ===
- Typhoon (JMA)
- Category 1 typhoon (SSHWS)
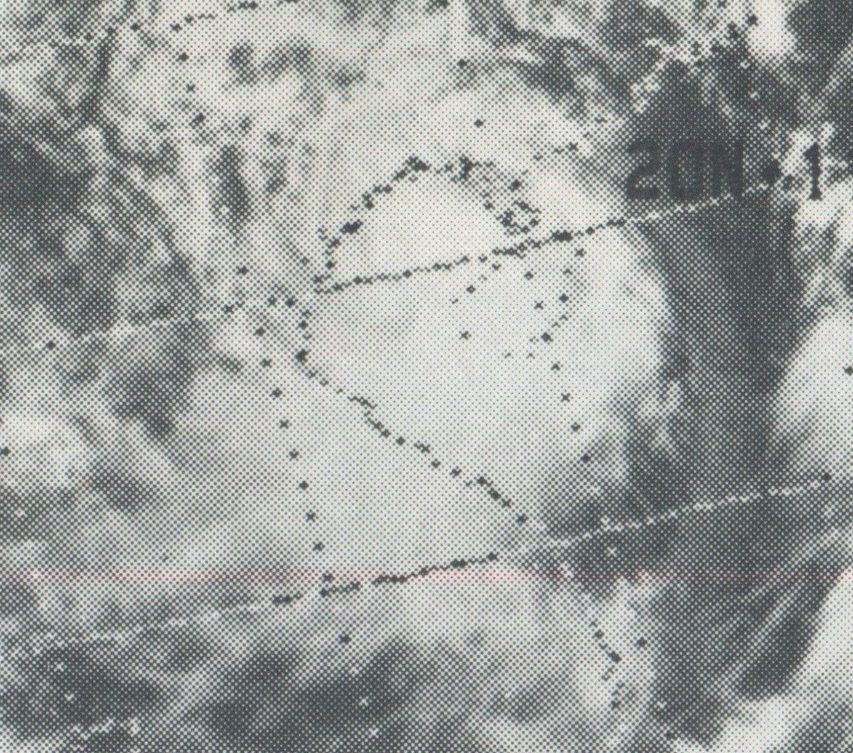
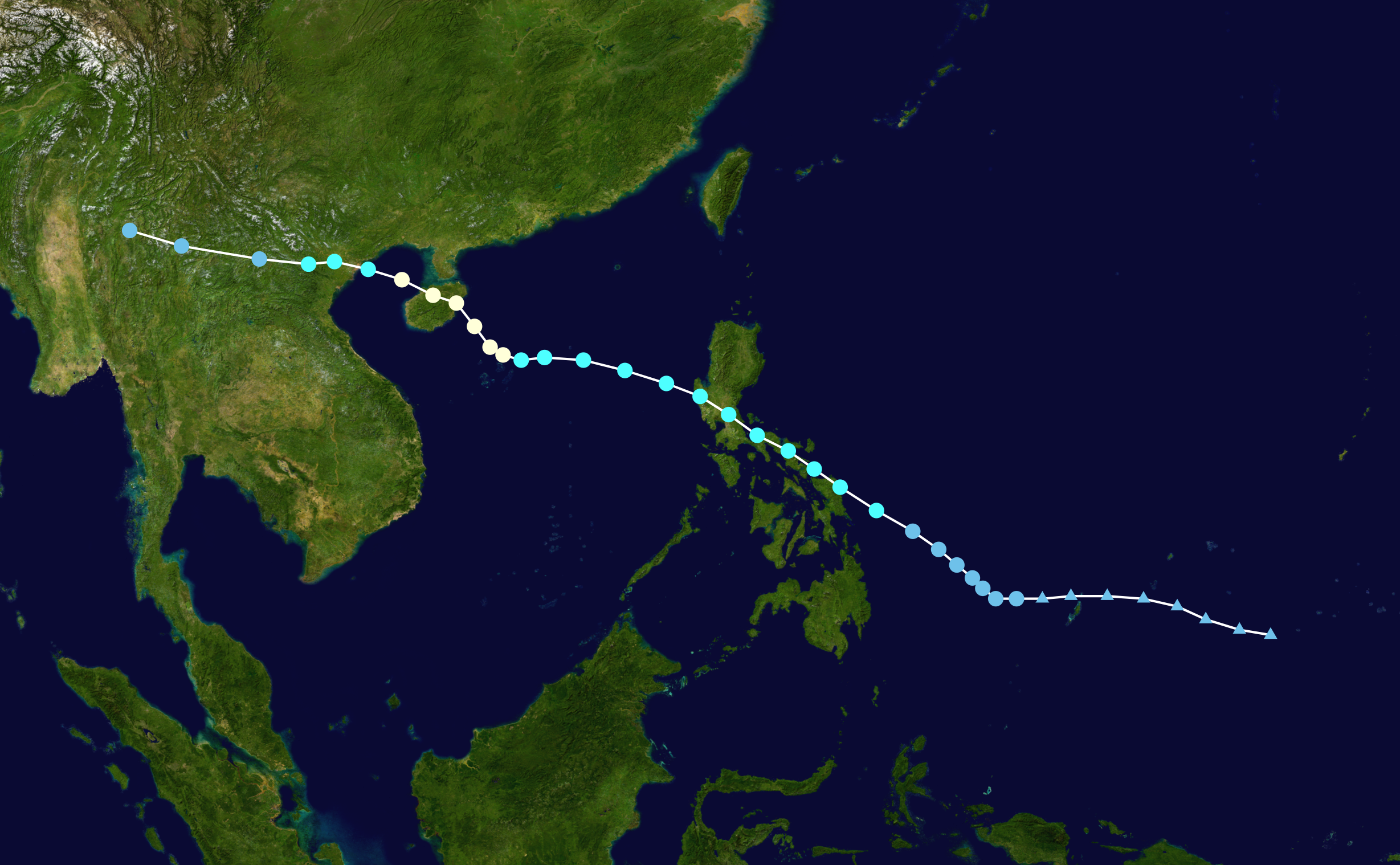
- Duration: July 16 – July 21
- Peak intensity: 130 km/h (80 mph) (10-min); 970 hPa (mbar)

Typhoon Sarah (Elang) formed in the western Pacific Ocean in 1977. It made landfall in the Philippines, Hainan, and Vietnam, causing damage and loss of life in these regions. The typhoon's impact highlighted the destructive potential of tropical cyclones in the area.

The lowest atmospheric pressure recorded on July 21 at a weather station in Phù Liễn, Haiphong (elevation 113 meters above sea level) was 950.6 hPa (28.07 inHg). Typhoon Sarah caused 101 deaths, 9 people were missing and 390 injuries in Vietnam. In Haiphong alone, 48 people were reported dead and 228 were injured.

=== Typhoon Thelma (Goring) ===
- Typhoon (JMA)
- Category 2 typhoon (SSHWS)
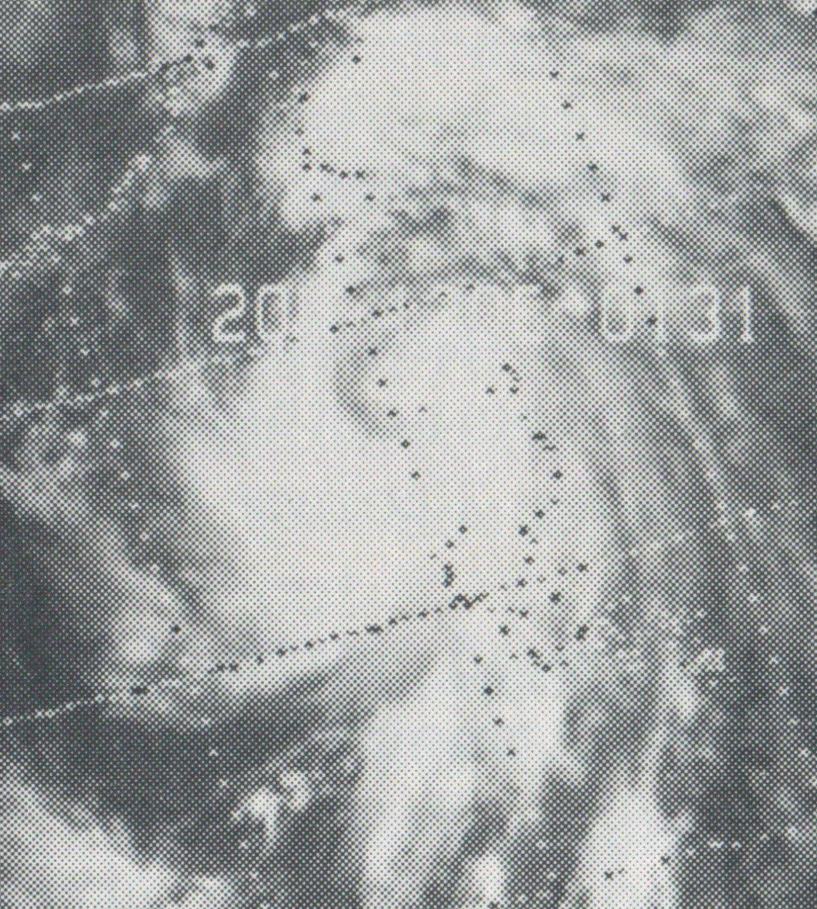
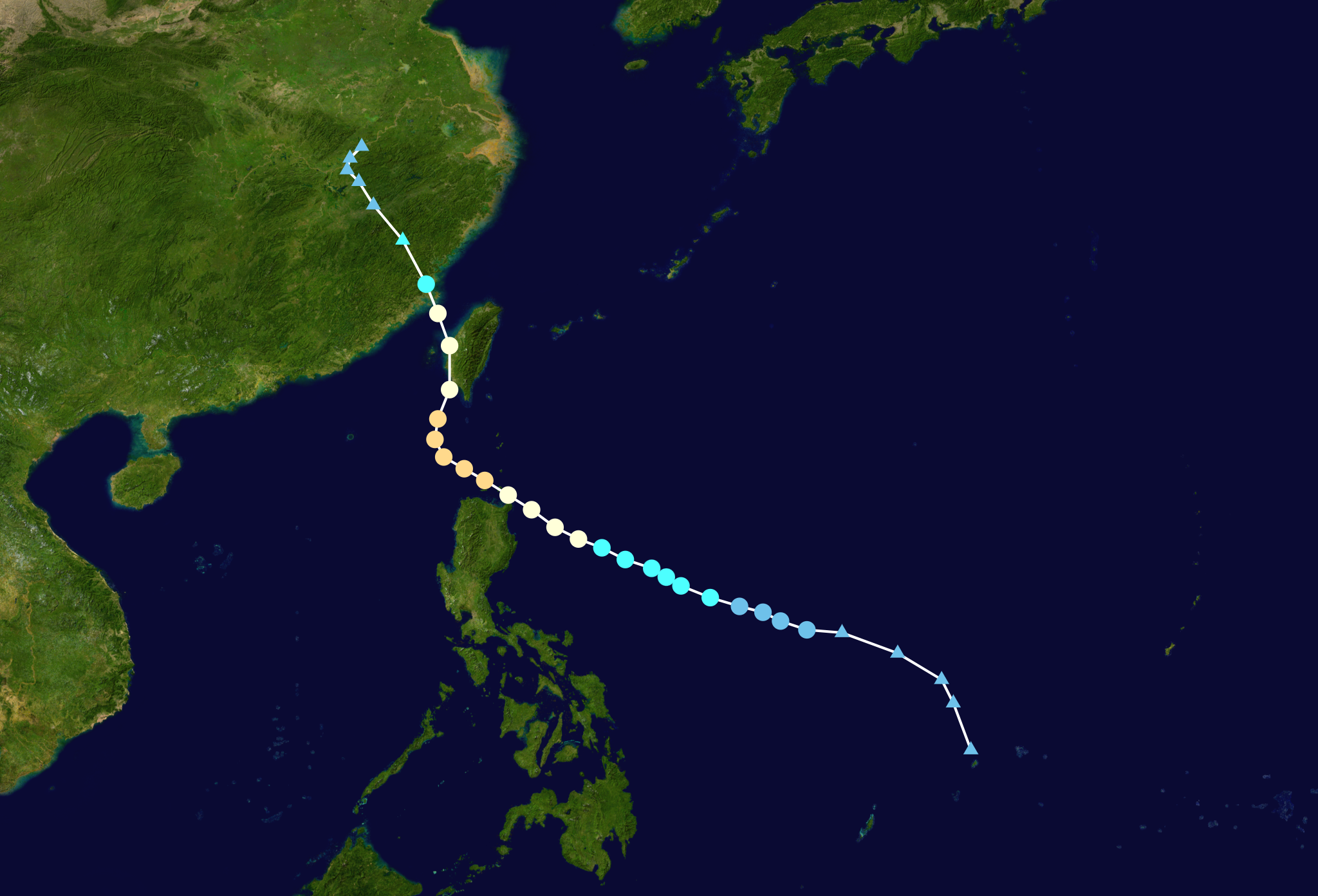
- Duration: July 21 – July 26
- Peak intensity: 130 km/h (80 mph) (10-min); 950 hPa (mbar)

A tropical disturbance east of the Philippines organized into a tropical depression on July 21. It moved to the northwest, strengthening into a tropical storm later that day and into a typhoon on the 22nd. After passing northern Luzon and dropping heavy rains, Thelma turned to the north, where it reached a peak intensity of 95 mph winds. The typhoon hit southern Taiwan on the 25th, crossed the island, and dissipated over southeastern China on the 26th. Though not a particularly strong storm, Thelma brought strong wind gusts and heavy rain, claiming more than 30 lives and bringing damage and destruction not seen to the island for over 80 years.

=== Typhoon Vera (Huling) ===
- Violent typhoon (JMA)
- Category 3 typhoon (SSHWS)
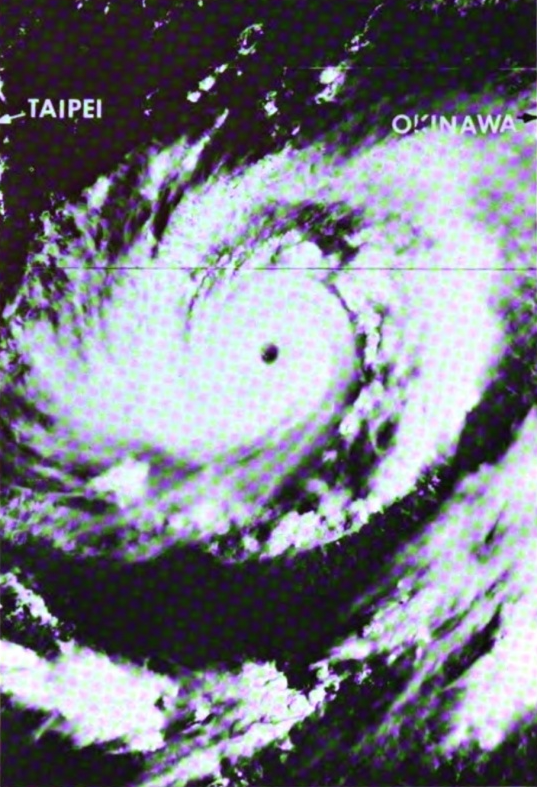
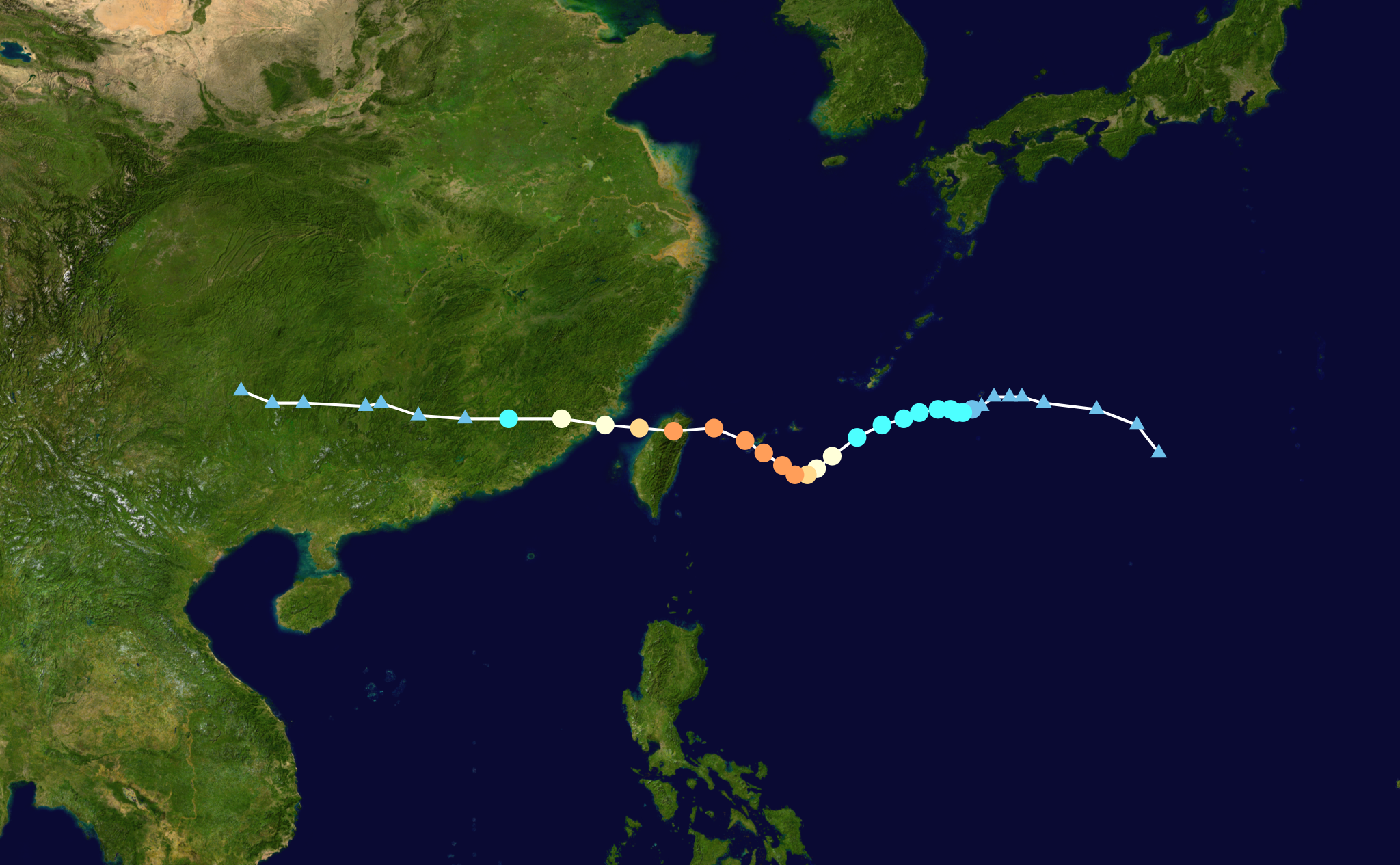
- Duration: July 28 – August 1
- Peak intensity: 205 km/h (125 mph) (10-min); 925 hPa (mbar)

Just 6 days after Thelma hit Taiwan, another typhoon was brewing to its east. Typhoon Vera, which developed on July 28, hit eastern Taiwan on the 31st as a 125 mph typhoon. It continued westward, and dissipated over southeastern China. The storm caused 25 additional fatalities to the island, with vast amounts of crop and property damage occurring.

=== Tropical Storm Wanda ===
- Tropical storm (JMA)
- Tropical storm (SSHWS)
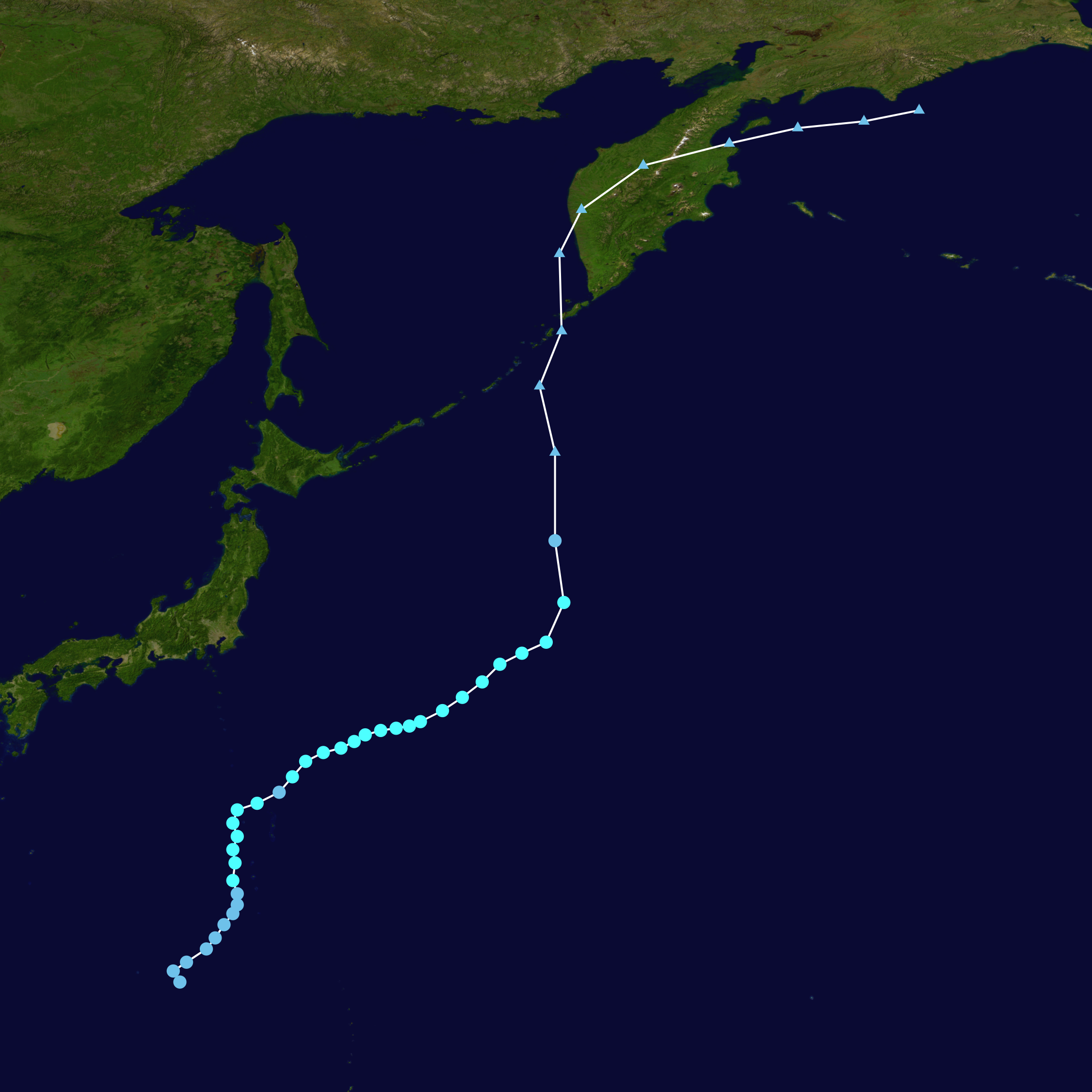
- Duration: July 31 – August 4
- Peak intensity: 75 km/h (45 mph) (10-min); 985 hPa (mbar)

Tropical Storm Wanda formed in the western Pacific Ocean in 1977.

=== Tropical Storm Amy (Ibiang) ===
- Severe tropical storm (JMA)
- Tropical storm (SSHWS)
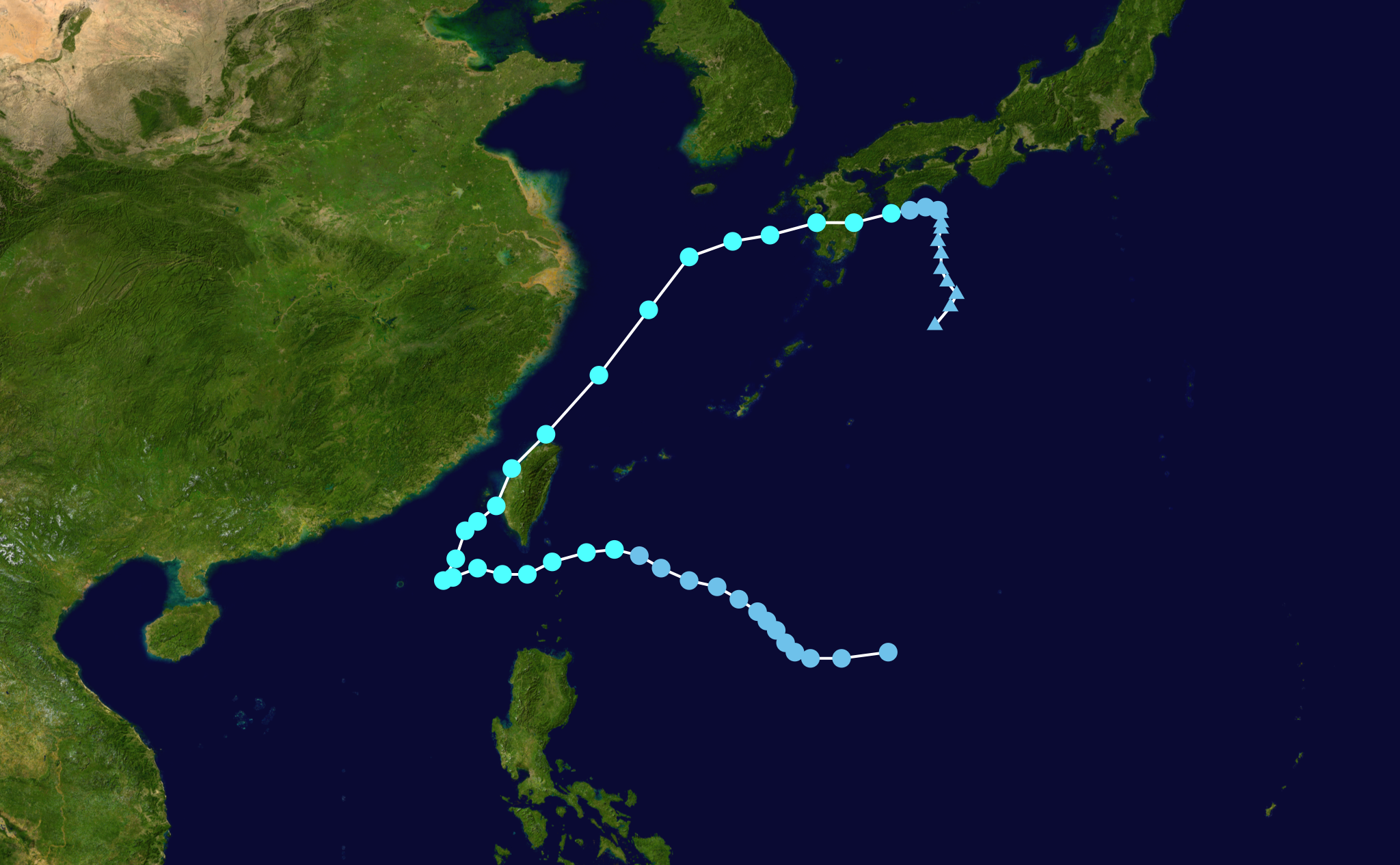
- Duration: August 20 – August 23
- Peak intensity: 110 km/h (70 mph) (10-min); 985 hPa (mbar)

Tropical Storm Amy (Ibiang) was a tropical cyclone that formed in the western Pacific Ocean during the 1977 Pacific typhoon season. It developed on August 20 and reached its peak intensity on August 21 with maximum sustained winds of 110 km/h (70 mph) and a minimum barometric pressure of 985 hPa (mbar). Amy made landfall in Taiwan, causing damage and flooding.

=== JMA Tropical Storm Eight ===
- Tropical storm (JMA)
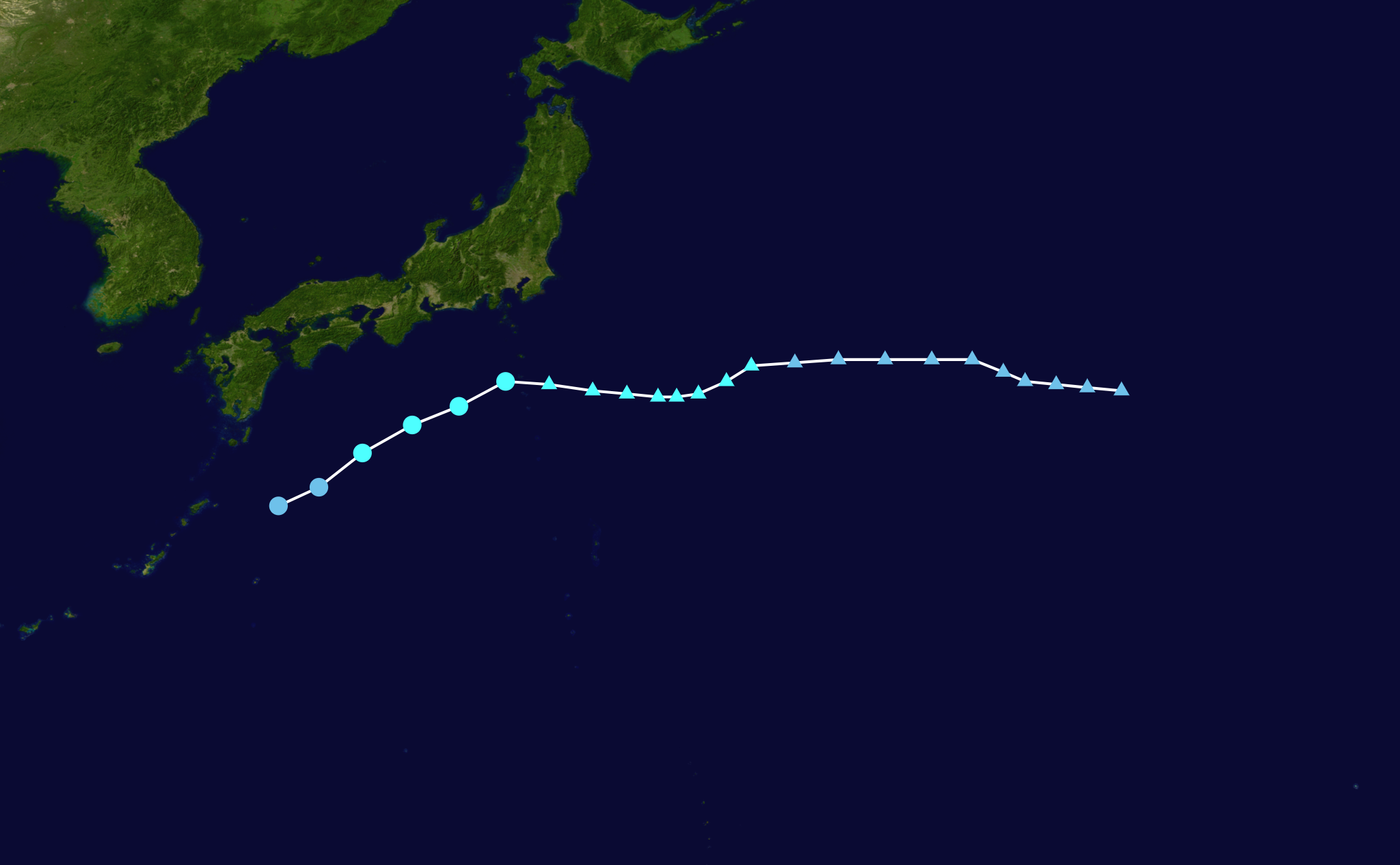
- Duration: August 21 – August 22
- Peak intensity: 75 km/h (45 mph) (10-min); 988 hPa (mbar)

JMA Tropical Storm Eight formed in the western Pacific Ocean in 1977. It did not make landfall and dissipated over open waters. The storm had minimal impact and did not cause significant damage or loss of life.

=== Typhoon Babe (Miling) ===
- Violent typhoon (JMA)
- Category 4 super typhoon (SSHWS)
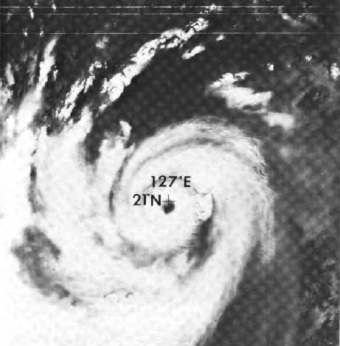
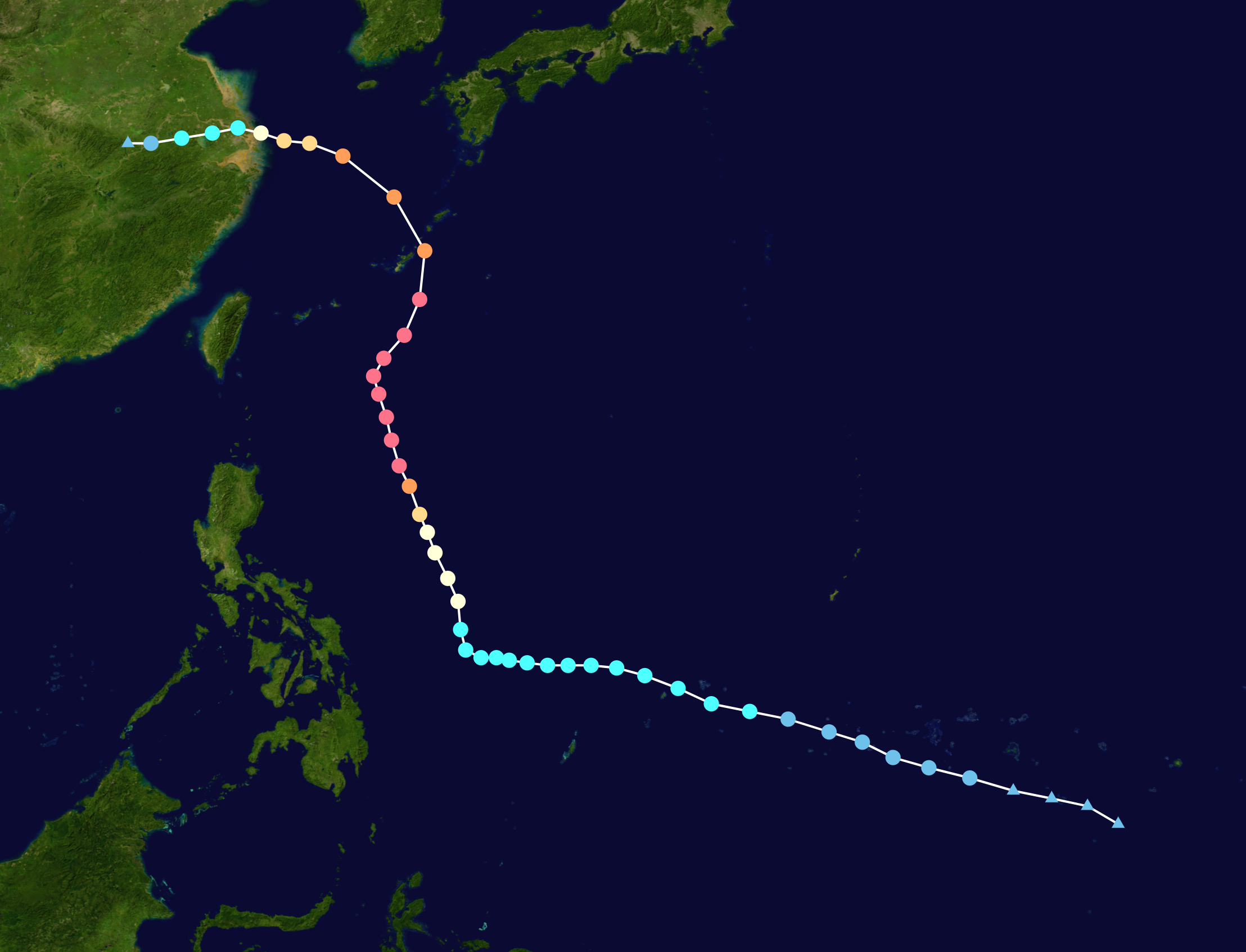
- Duration: September 2 – September 12
- Peak intensity: 205 km/h (125 mph) (10-min); 905 hPa (mbar)

Developing as a tropical depression on September 2, Babe initially tracked west-northwestward as it intensified. On September 5, an abrupt shift in steering currents caused the system to turn north-northwestward. Over the following two days, Babe quickly intensified, ultimately attaining its peak intensity early on September 8 with winds of 240 km/h (150 mph) and a barometric pressure of 905 mbar (hPa; 26.72 inHg). Not long after reaching this strength, another shift in the steering patterns caused the typhoon to execute a prolonged counter-clockwise arc, causing it to track through the Ryukyu Islands, as it interacted with a low pressure originating from the Korean Peninsula. During this time, the system gradually weakened and eventually it made landfall near Shanghai, China on September 11 as a minimal typhoon before dissipating inland the following day.

Passing through the Ryukyu Islands as a powerful typhoon, Babe caused considerable damage in the region. More than 1,000 homes were destroyed and nearly 7,000 more were damaged or flooded. One person was killed on Amami Ōshima and 77 others were injured throughout the country. Total losses reached ¥6.1 billion (US$23 million). Offshore, over 100 vessels were affected by the storm, including a Panamanian freighter where 13 people died. In China, more than 24,000 homes were destroyed and nine people were killed.

=== Tropical Storm Carla (Luming) ===
- Tropical storm (JMA)
- Tropical storm (SSHWS)
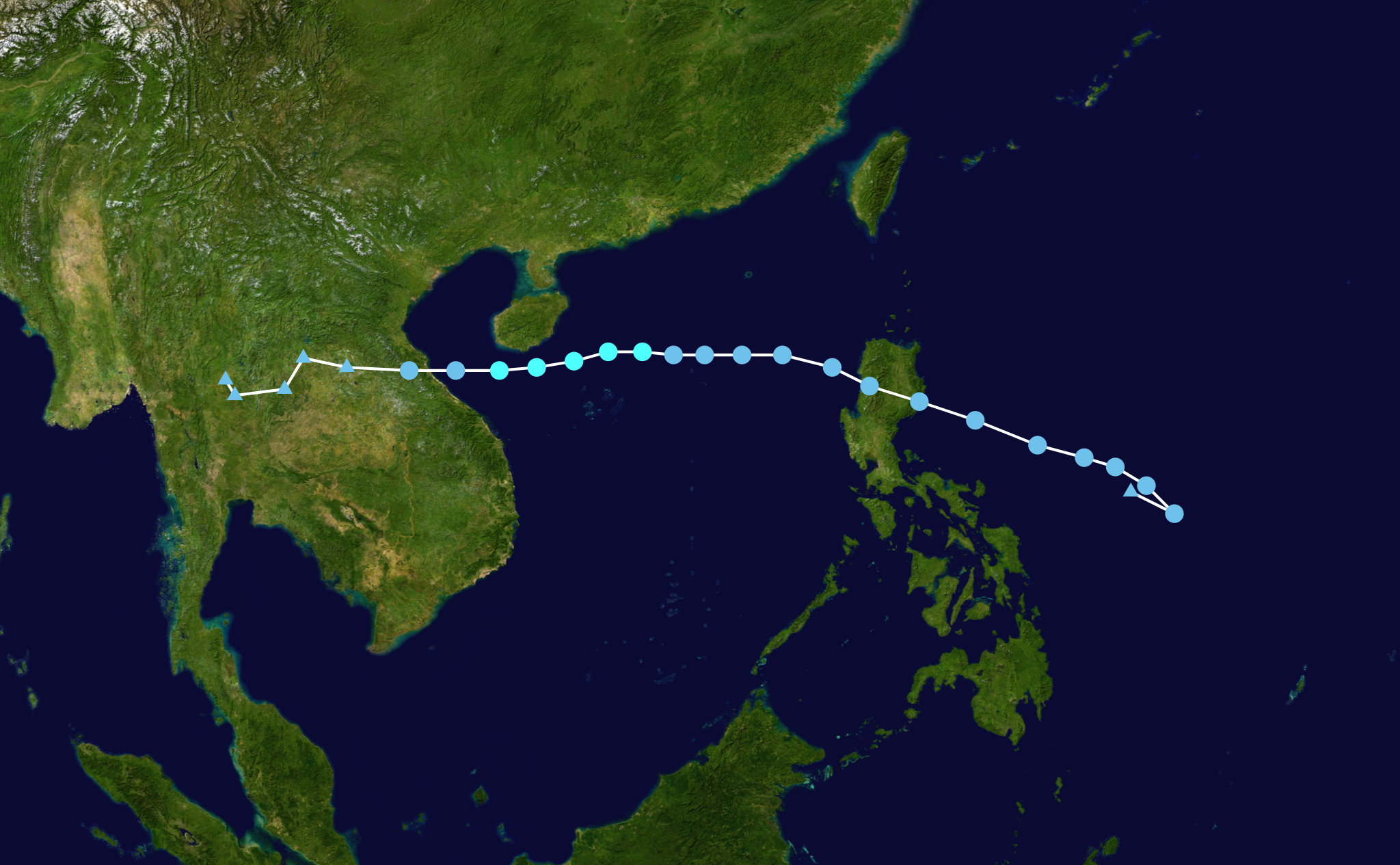
- Duration: September 3 – September 5
- Peak intensity: 65 km/h (40 mph) (10-min); 990 hPa (mbar)

Tropical Storm Carla (Luming) was a weak tropical storm that formed in the western North Pacific Ocean in 1977. It had a short lifespan and caused limited impact. The 1977 Pacific typhoon season was one of the least active on record.

=== Typhoon Dinah (Openg) ===
- Typhoon (JMA)
- Category 1 typhoon (SSHWS)
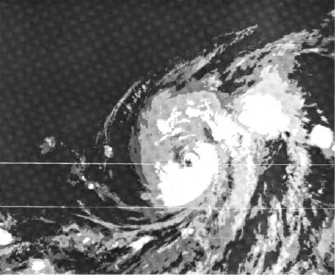
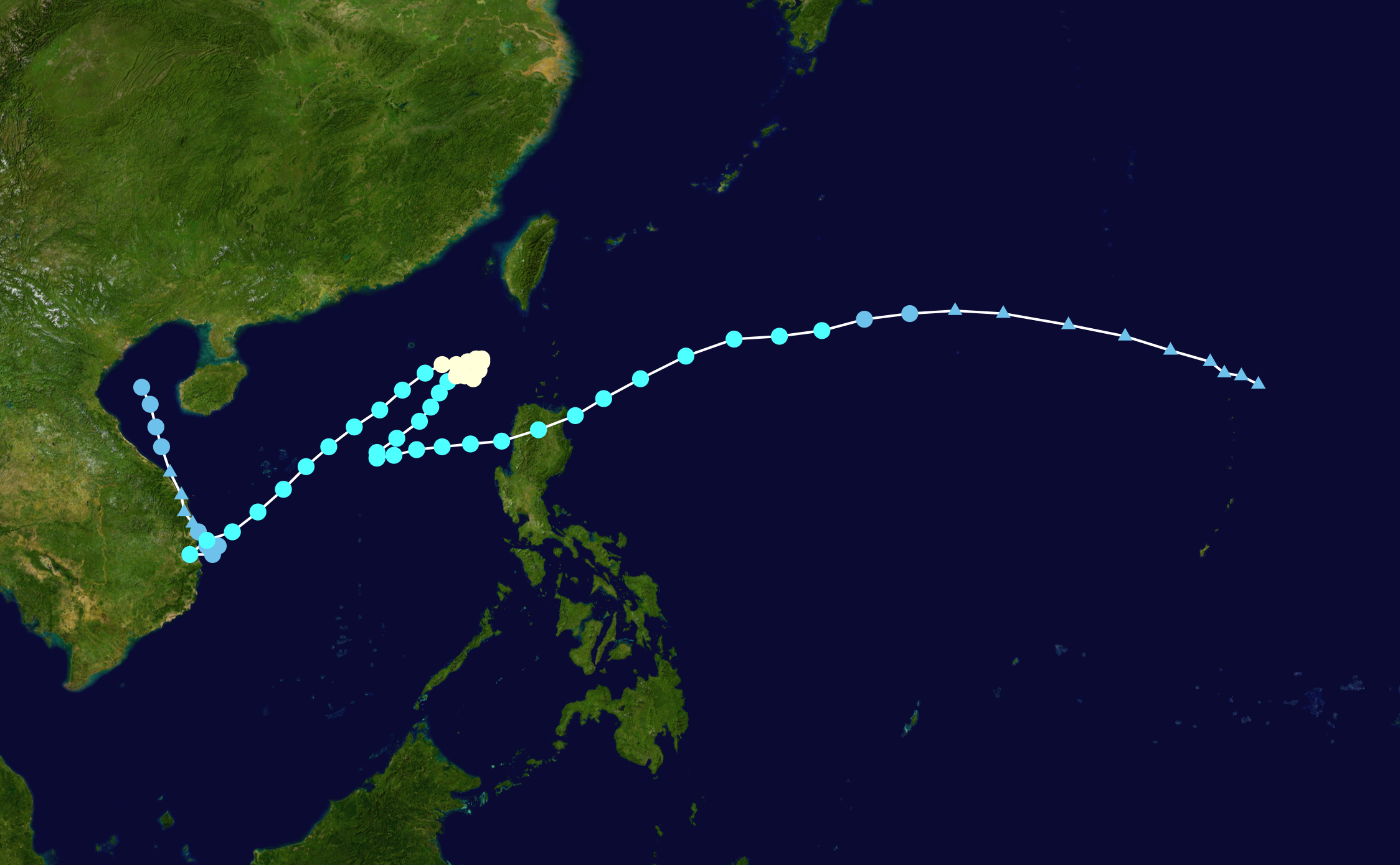
- Duration: September 14 – September 23
- Peak intensity: 130 km/h (80 mph) (10-min); 965 hPa (mbar)

The monsoon trough spawned a tropical storm on September 14 northeast of the northern Philippines. The previous typhoon brought the trough more northward, hence the unusually high latitude for a monsoon storm. Strong high pressure to Dinah's northwest forced the storm to the southwest, where it crossed northern Luzon on the 15th and 16th. Weak steering currents in the South China Sea allowed Dinah to drift, first then to the northeast then back to the west-southwest. Generally favorable conditions allowed Dinah to reach typhoon strength on the 19th, but a developing tropical storm to its northeast caused it to weaken. The building of the subtropical ridge forced Dinah to the southwest, where it hit southern Vietnam on the 23rd as a tropical depression. The remnants turned northward, crossed the Gulf of Tonkin, and dissipated over China on the 27th.

Dinah brought heavy rain and flooding to Luzon that killed 54 people and left 11 others missing.

=== Tropical Storm Emma ===
- Severe tropical storm (JMA)
- Tropical storm (SSHWS)
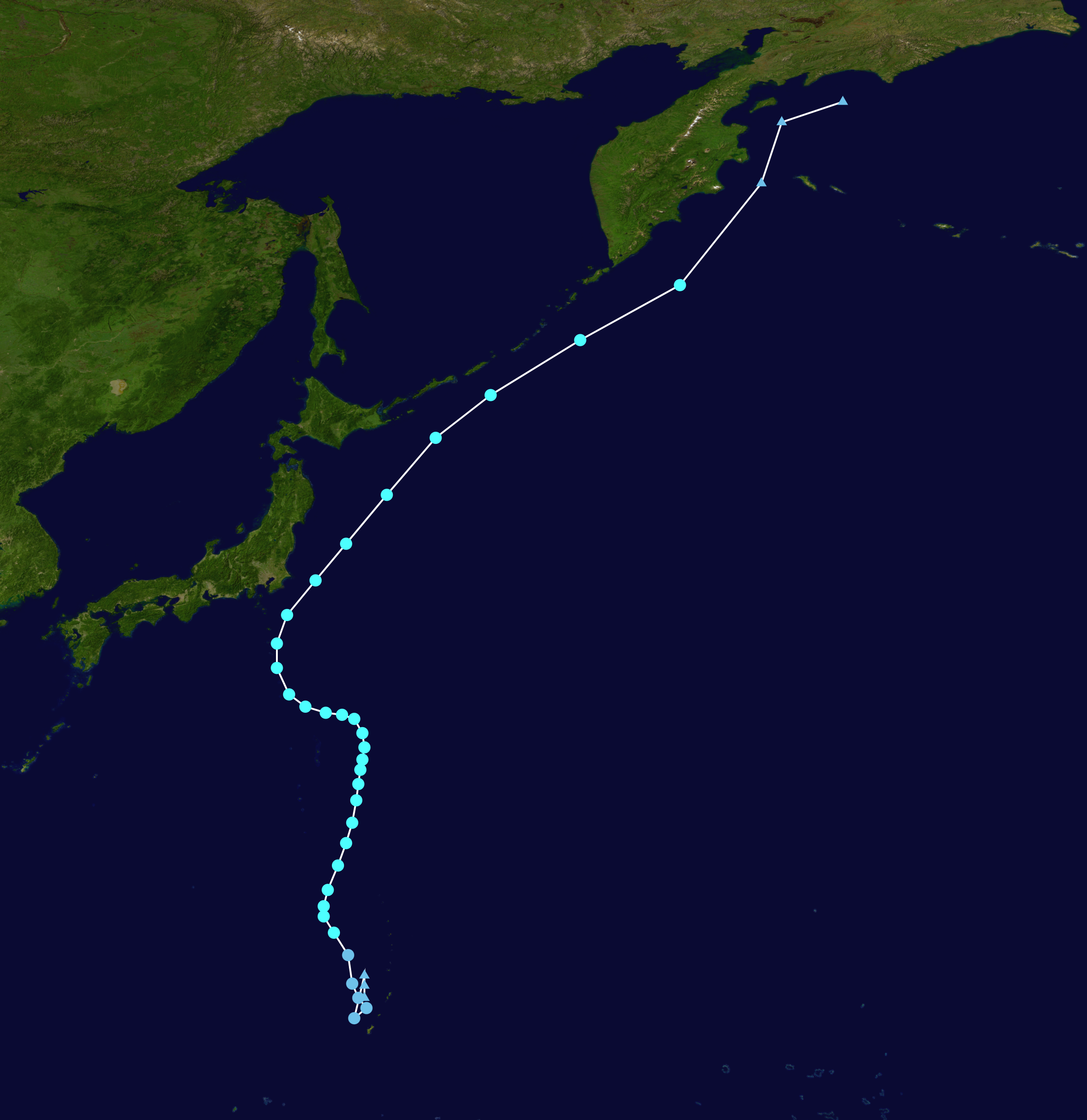
- Duration: September 15 – September 20
- Peak intensity: 110 km/h (70 mph) (10-min); 965 hPa (mbar)

Tropical Storm Emma formed in the western Pacific Ocean in 1977. It reached maximum sustained winds of 60 knots and caused some damage in Southeast Asia. Detailed information about its track and intensity can be found on the Digital Typhoon website.

=== Tropical Storm Freda (Pining) ===
- Severe tropical storm (JMA)
- Tropical storm (SSHWS)
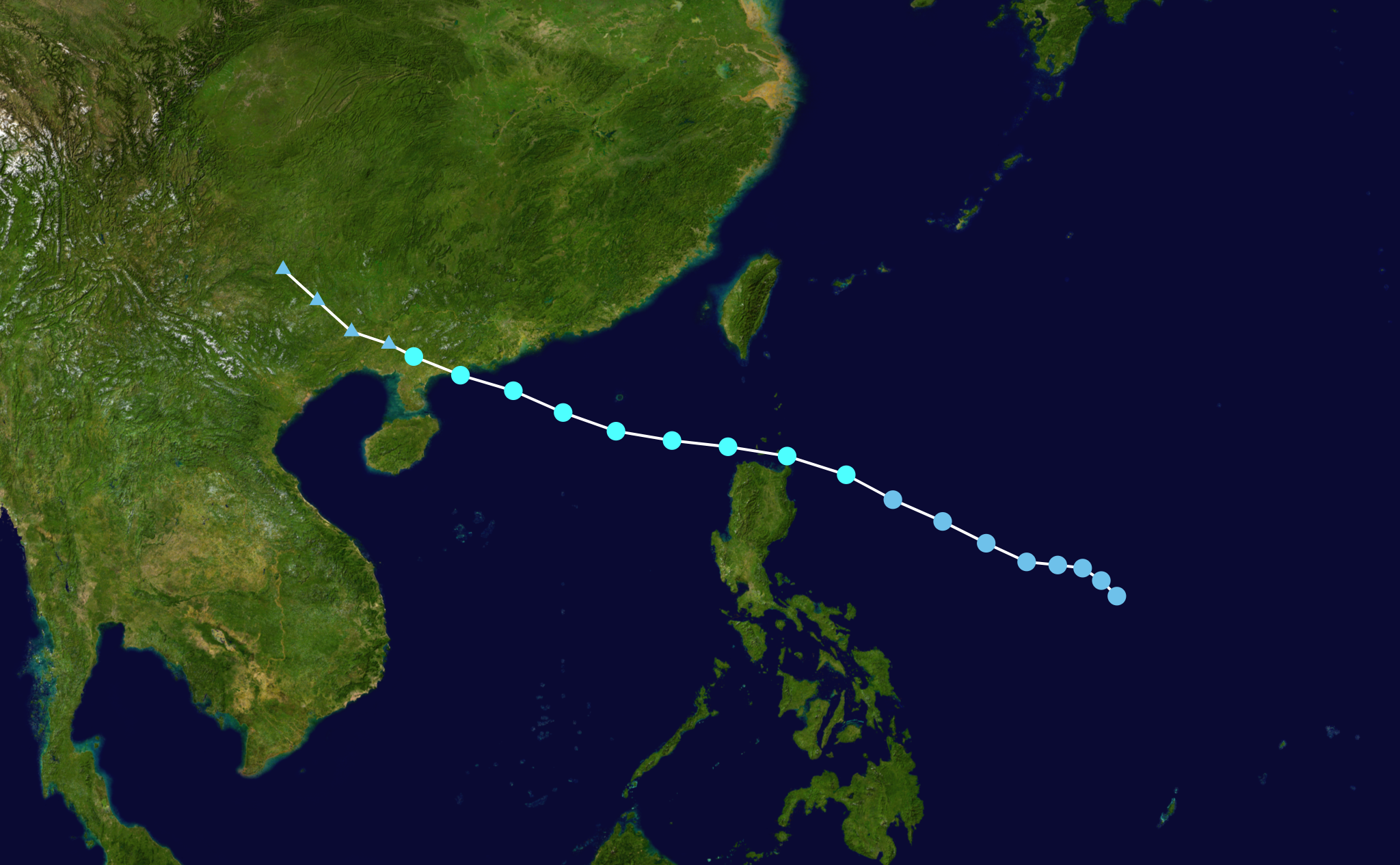
- Duration: September 23 – September 25
- Peak intensity: 100 km/h (65 mph) (10-min); 980 hPa (mbar)

Severe Tropical Storm Freda (Pining) formed in the western Pacific Ocean in 1977. It reached peak intensity with 60 mph winds and a minimum pressure of 990 hPa. The storm brought heavy rain and strong winds to parts of the Philippines and Taiwan, causing localized flooding and property damage. .

=== Typhoon Gilda ===
- Typhoon (JMA)
- Category 1 typhoon (SSHWS)
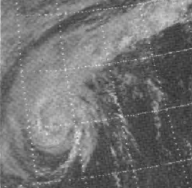
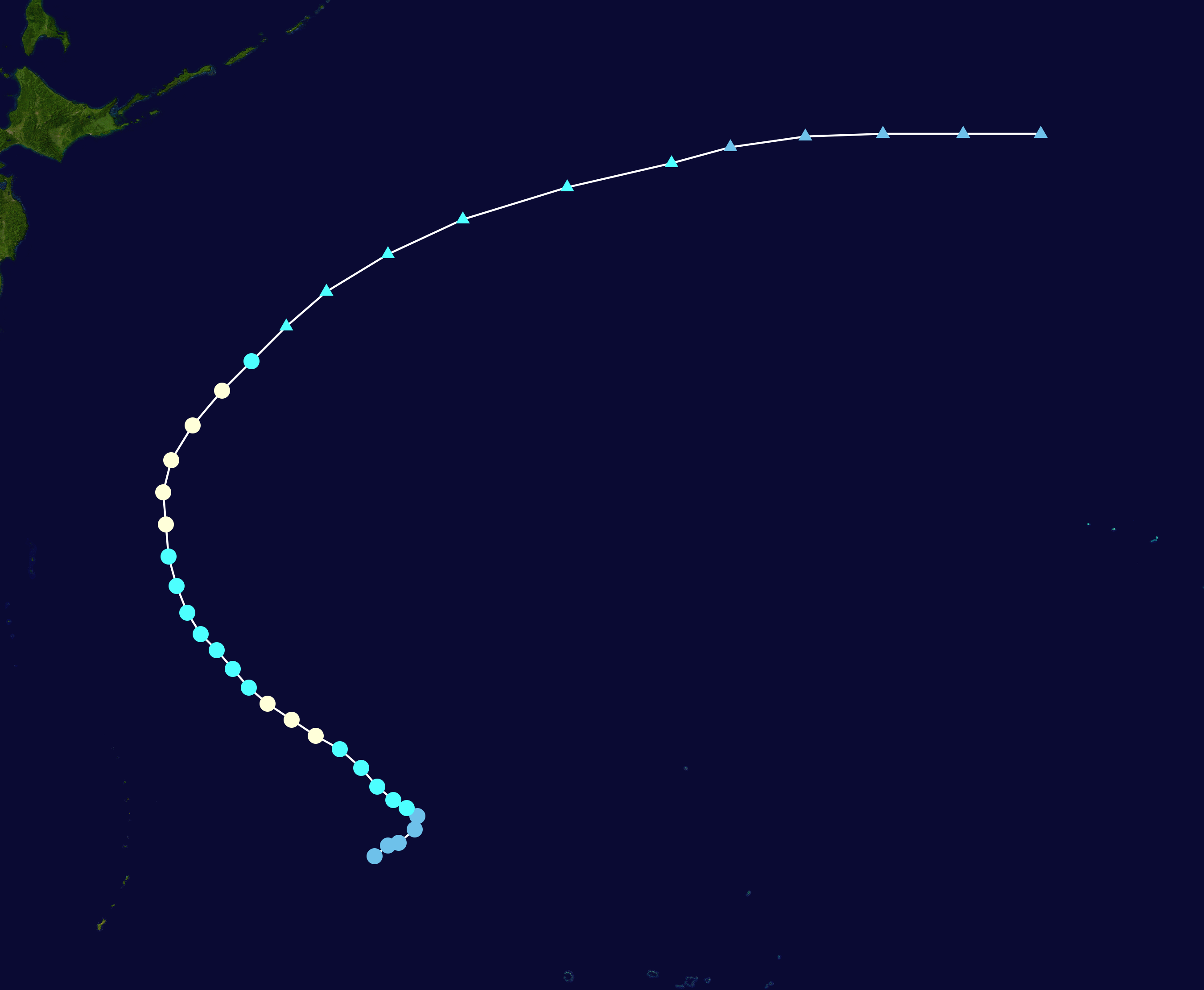
- Duration: October 3 – October 10
- Peak intensity: 120 km/h (75 mph) (10-min); 965 hPa (mbar)

Typhoon Gilda formed in the western Pacific Ocean in 1977. It reached peak intensity with 100 mph winds and a minimum pressure of 965 hPa. The typhoon passed to the east of Japan, causing minimal impact on land.

=== JMA Tropical Storm Fifteen ===
- Tropical storm (JMA)
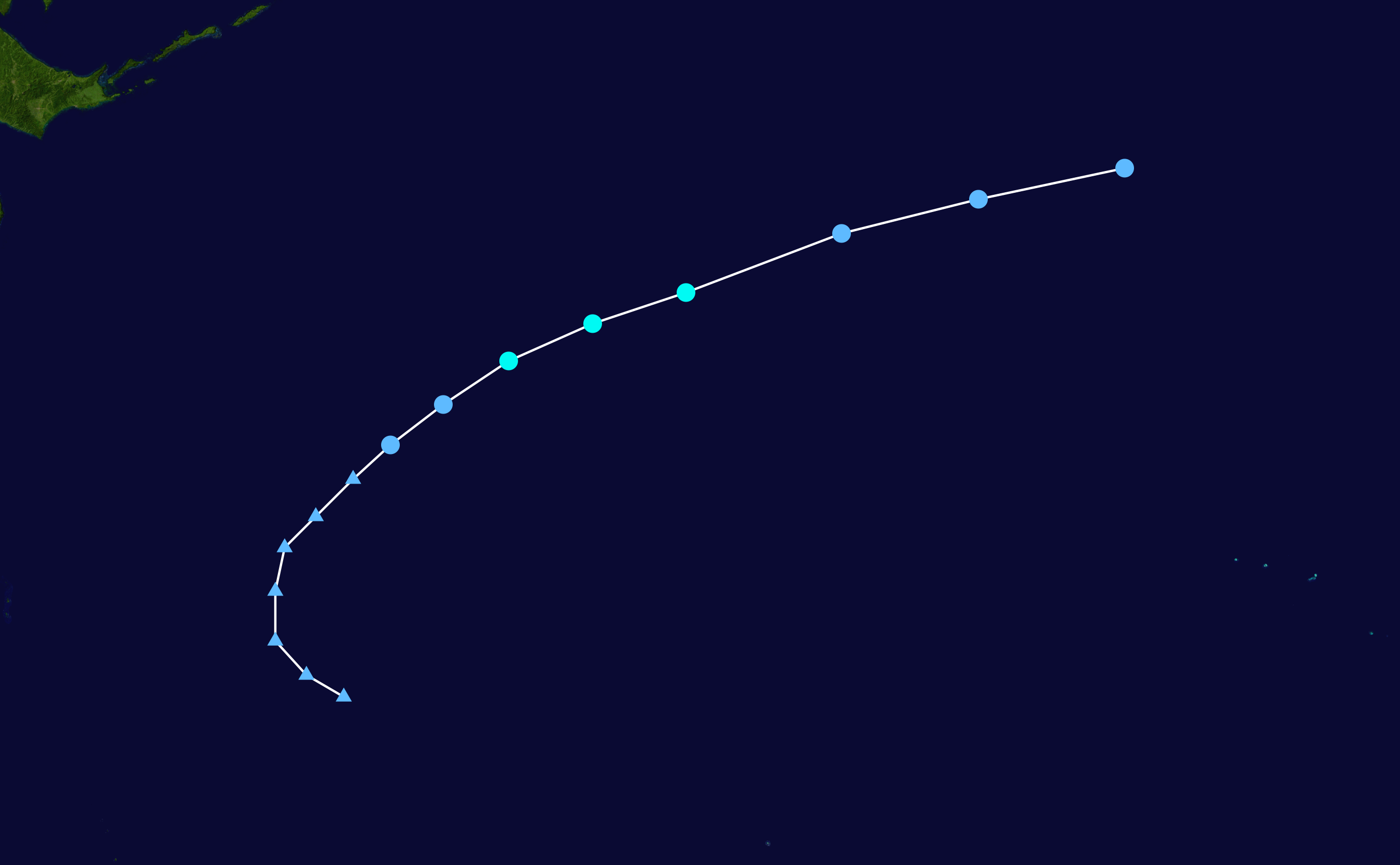
- Duration: October 11 – October 14
- Peak intensity: 75 km/h (45 mph) (10-min); 990 hPa (mbar)

JMA Tropical Storm Fifteen formed in the western Pacific Ocean in 1977. It reached peak intensity with 45 mph winds and a minimum pressure of 990 hPa.

=== Tropical Depression Rubing ===
- Tropical depression (JMA)
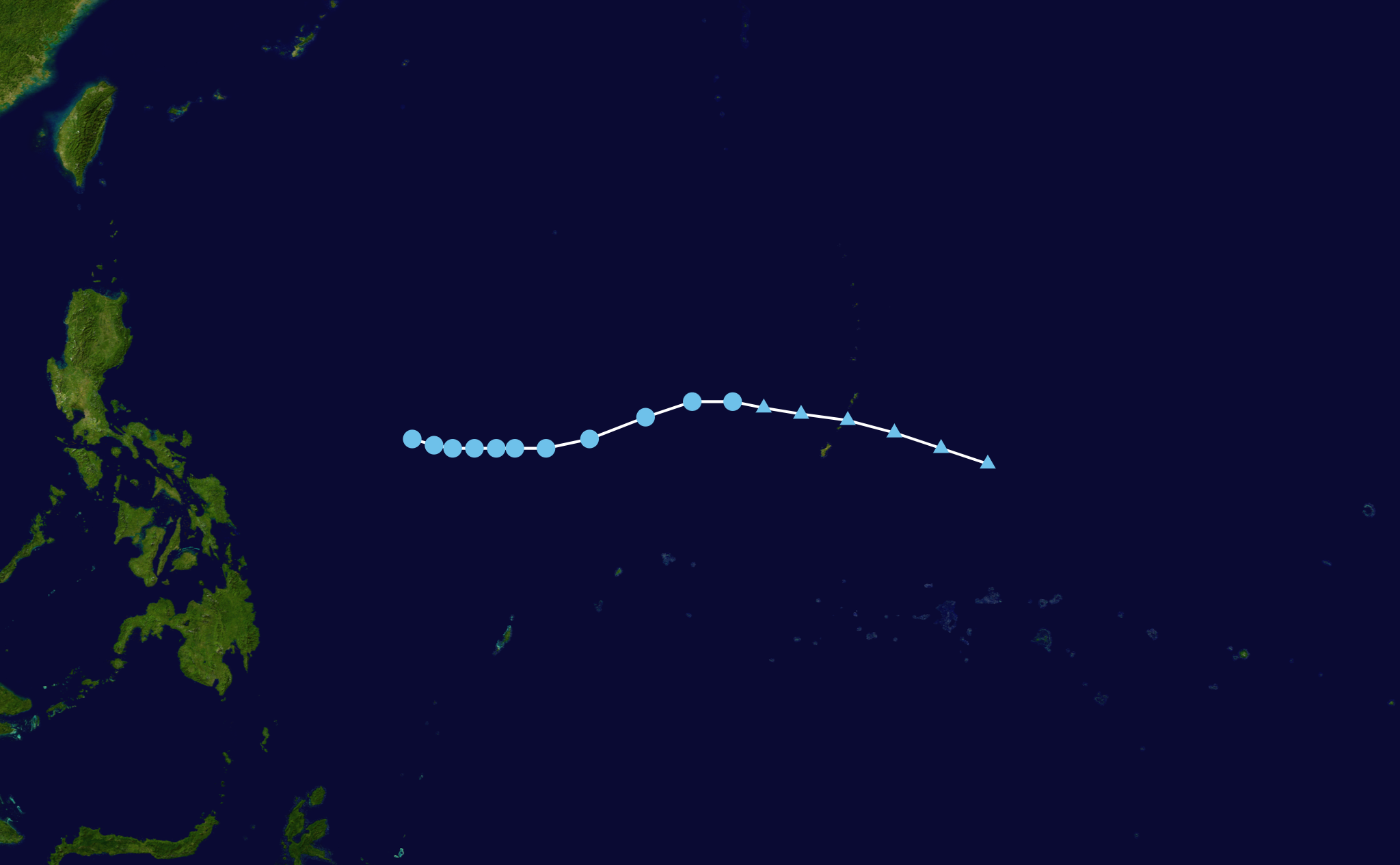
- Duration: October 14 – October 16
- Peak intensity: 55 km/h (35 mph) (10-min);

Tropical Depression Rubing was a short-lived tropical cyclone that formed in the western Pacific Ocean in 1977. It did not intensify into a tropical storm and dissipated shortly after formation. The storm had minimal impact on land and did not cause significant damage or loss of life.

=== Tropical Storm Harriet (Saling) ===
- Severe tropical storm (JMA)
- Tropical storm (SSHWS)
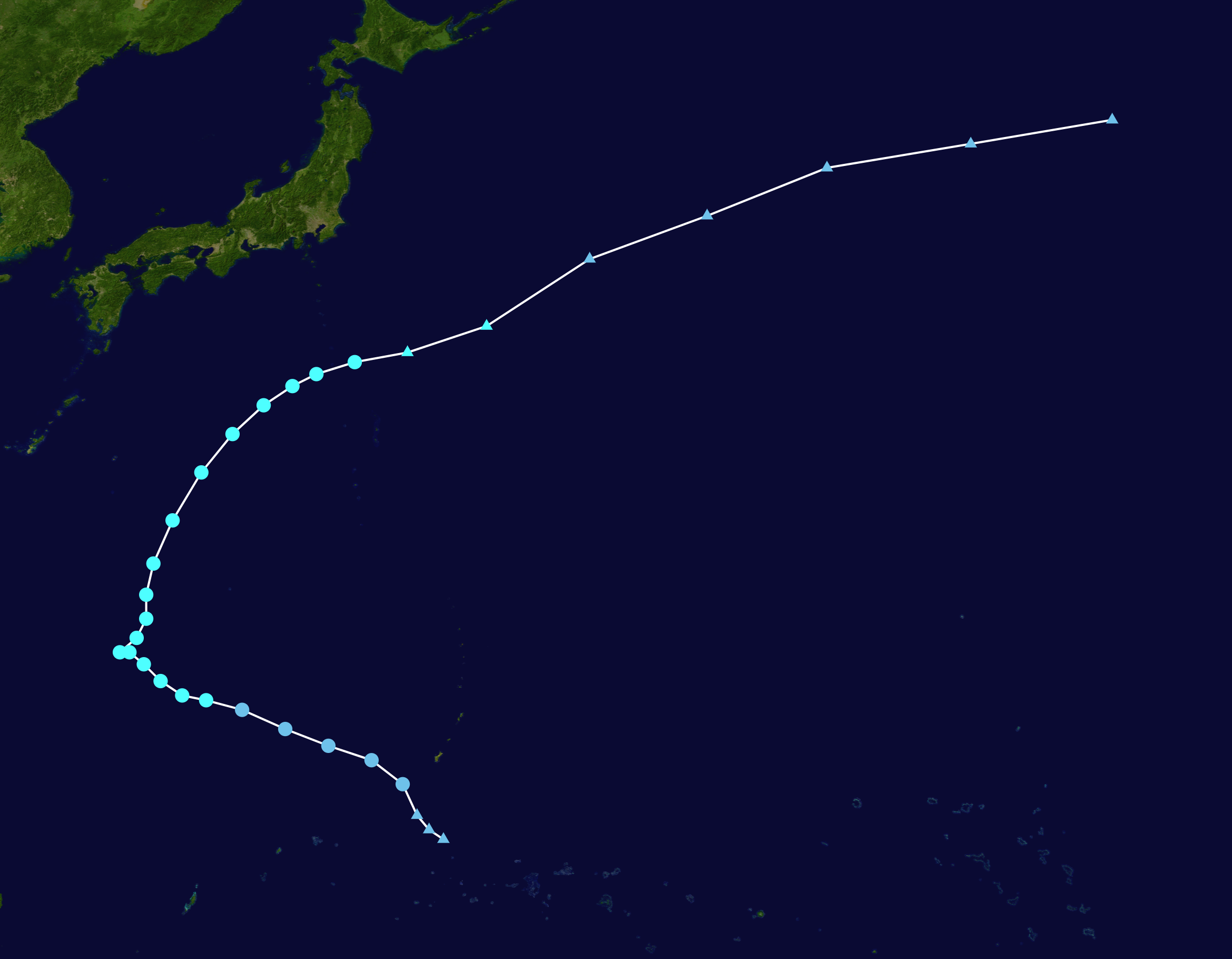
- Duration: October 16 – October 20
- Peak intensity: 100 km/h (65 mph) (10-min); 980 hPa (mbar)

Tropical Storm Harriet (Saling) formed in the western Pacific Ocean in 1977. It remained at sea and did not make landfall in Asia. The storm continued north into the Bering Sea and broke the then record for most powerful storm in the north Pacific on October 25th at 926 mb. Two homes were blown off of their foundations in Atka, while Adak experienced a 12-hour period of 110 mph or greater gusts.

=== Typhoon Ivy ===
- Typhoon (JMA)
- Category 2 typhoon (SSHWS)
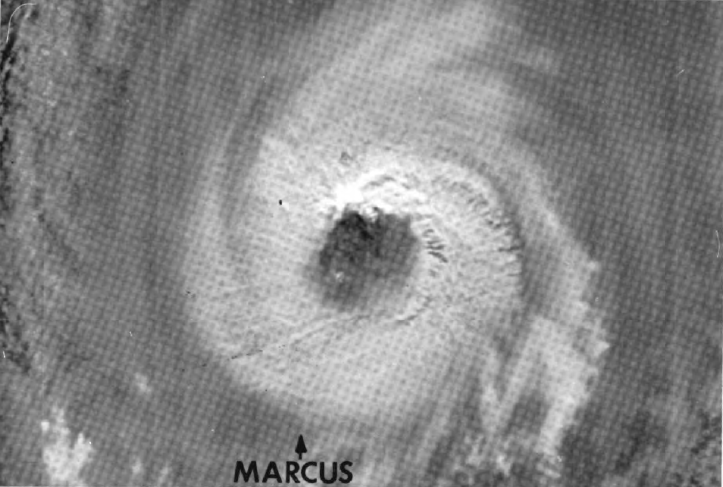
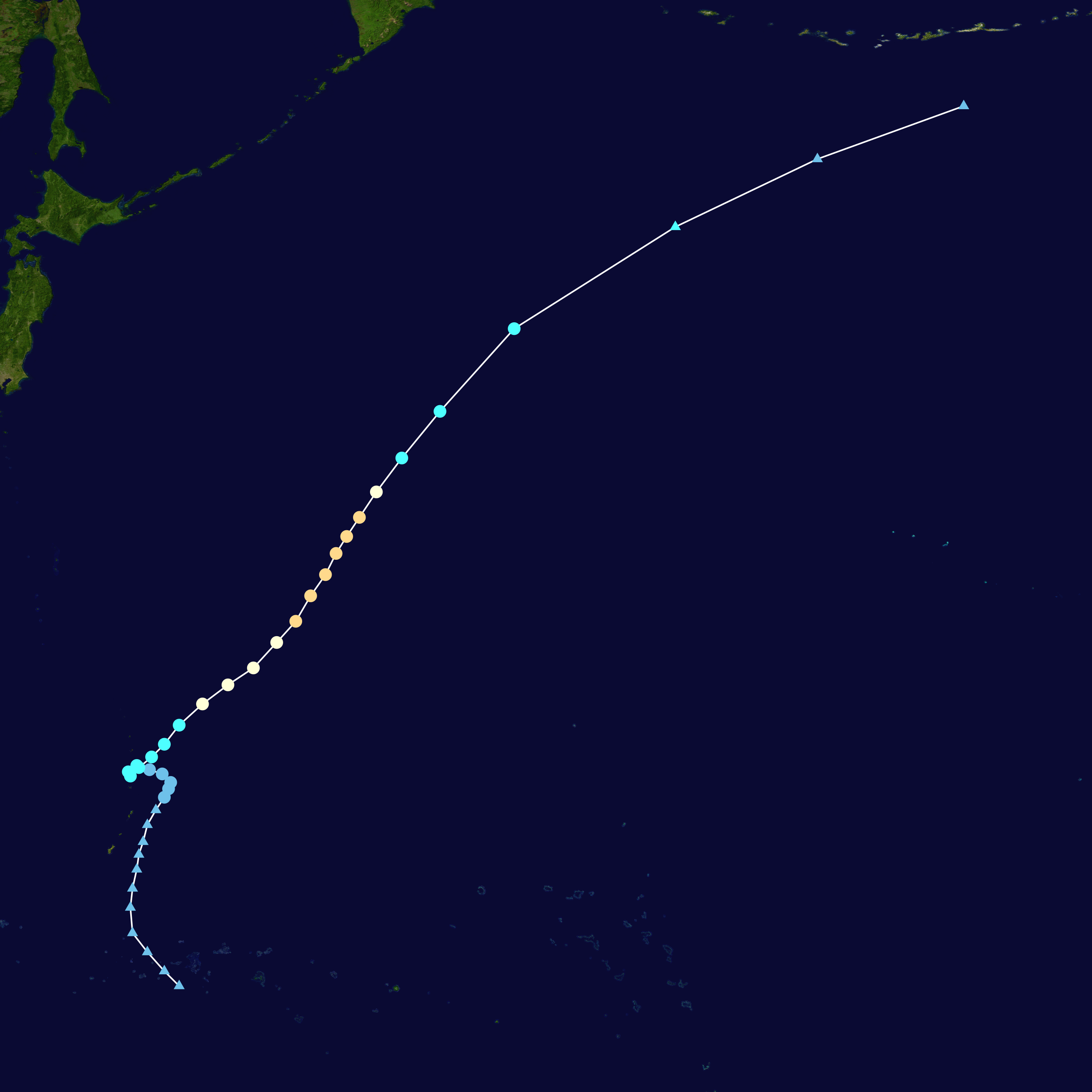
- Duration: October 21 – October 27
- Peak intensity: 150 km/h (90 mph) (10-min); 940 hPa (mbar)

Typhoon Ivy formed in the western Pacific Ocean in 1977. It reached peak intensity as a Category 2 typhoon with winds of 100 mph (160 km/h). The typhoon impacted the Marshall Islands and the Philippines, causing significant damage and loss of life, particularly in the Philippines. It was a powerful storm that left a lasting impact on the affected regions.

=== Typhoon Jean ===
- Typhoon (JMA)
- Category 1 typhoon (SSHWS)
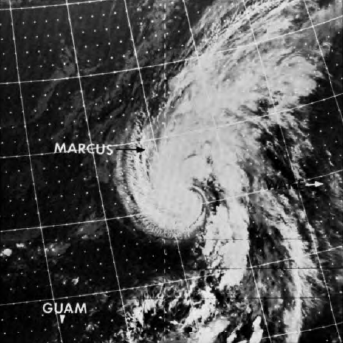
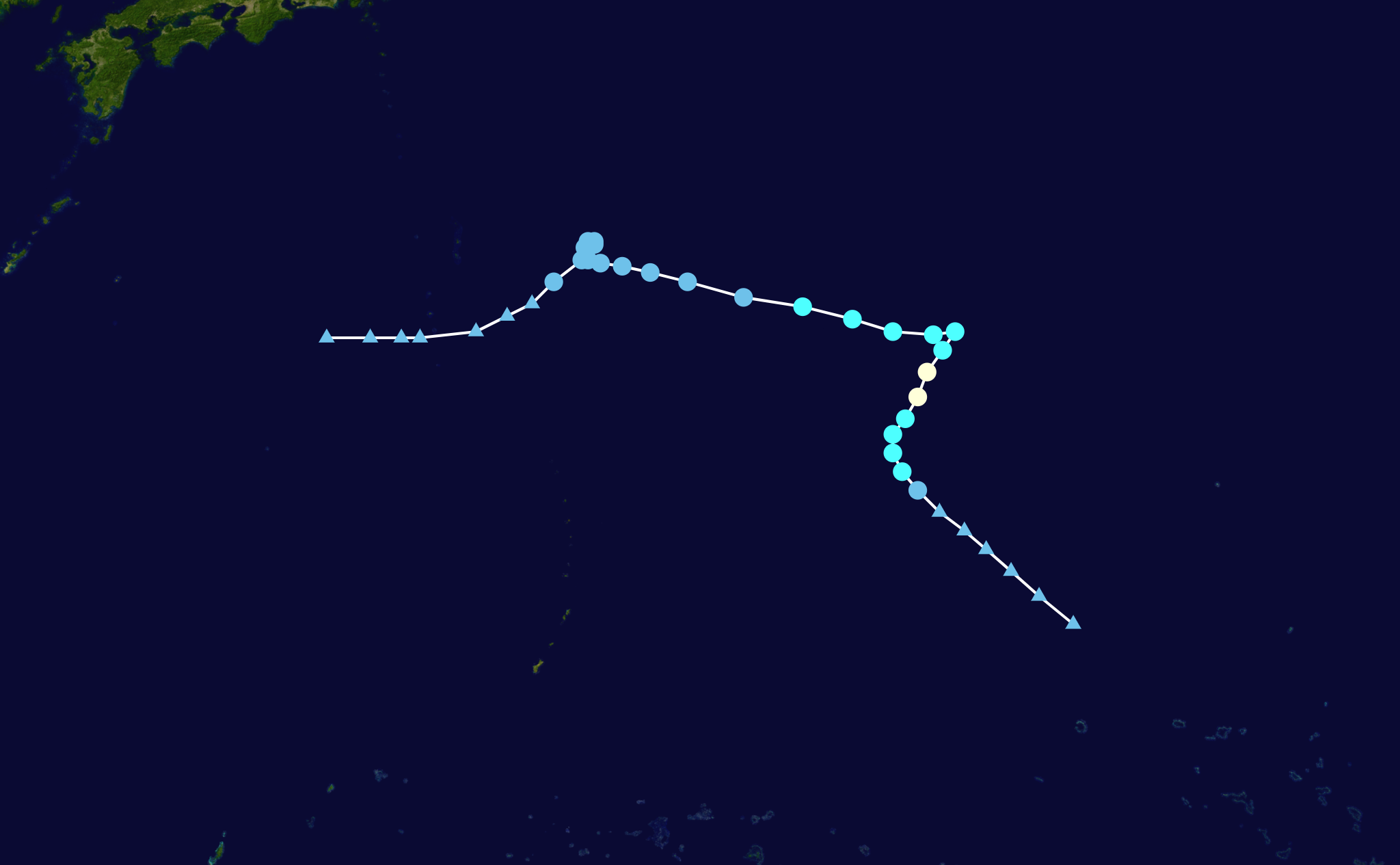
- Duration: October 28 – November 3
- Peak intensity: 120 km/h (75 mph) (10-min); 970 hPa (mbar)

Typhoon Jean was a tropical depression. It quickly became a tropical storm and on October 31, became a typhoon.Typhoon Jean formed in the western Pacific Ocean in 1977. It remained at sea and did not make landfall, affecting no one. The storm eventually dissipated without causing any significant impact.

=== Typhoon Kim (Unding) ===
- Violent typhoon (JMA)
- Category 4 typhoon (SSHWS)
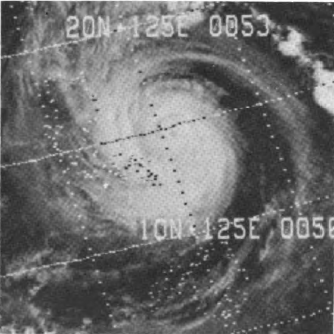
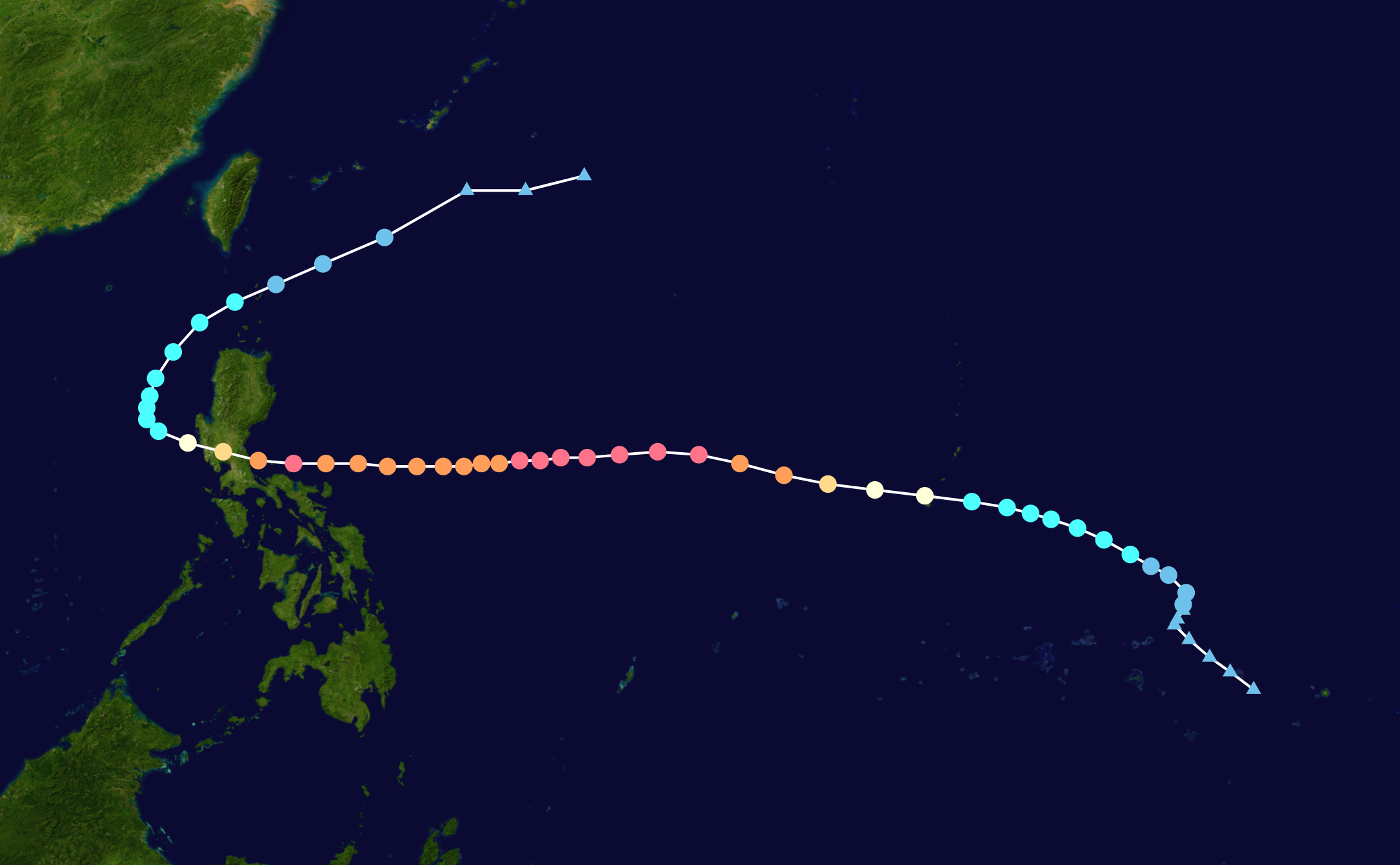
- Duration: November 6 – November 17
- Peak intensity: 205 km/h (125 mph) (10-min); 920 hPa (mbar)

Typhoon Kim was a 150 mph super typhoon that hit the northern Philippines on November 13. The typhoon's heavy rains caused flash flooding that left 55 people dead with widespread damage. A further 47 people died when the upper floors of a hotel caught fire during the storm.

=== Typhoon Lucy (Walding) ===
- Violent typhoon (JMA)
- Category 4 typhoon (SSHWS)
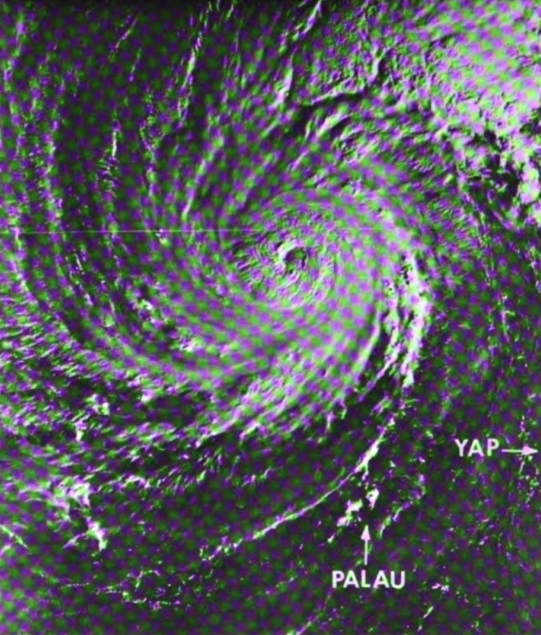
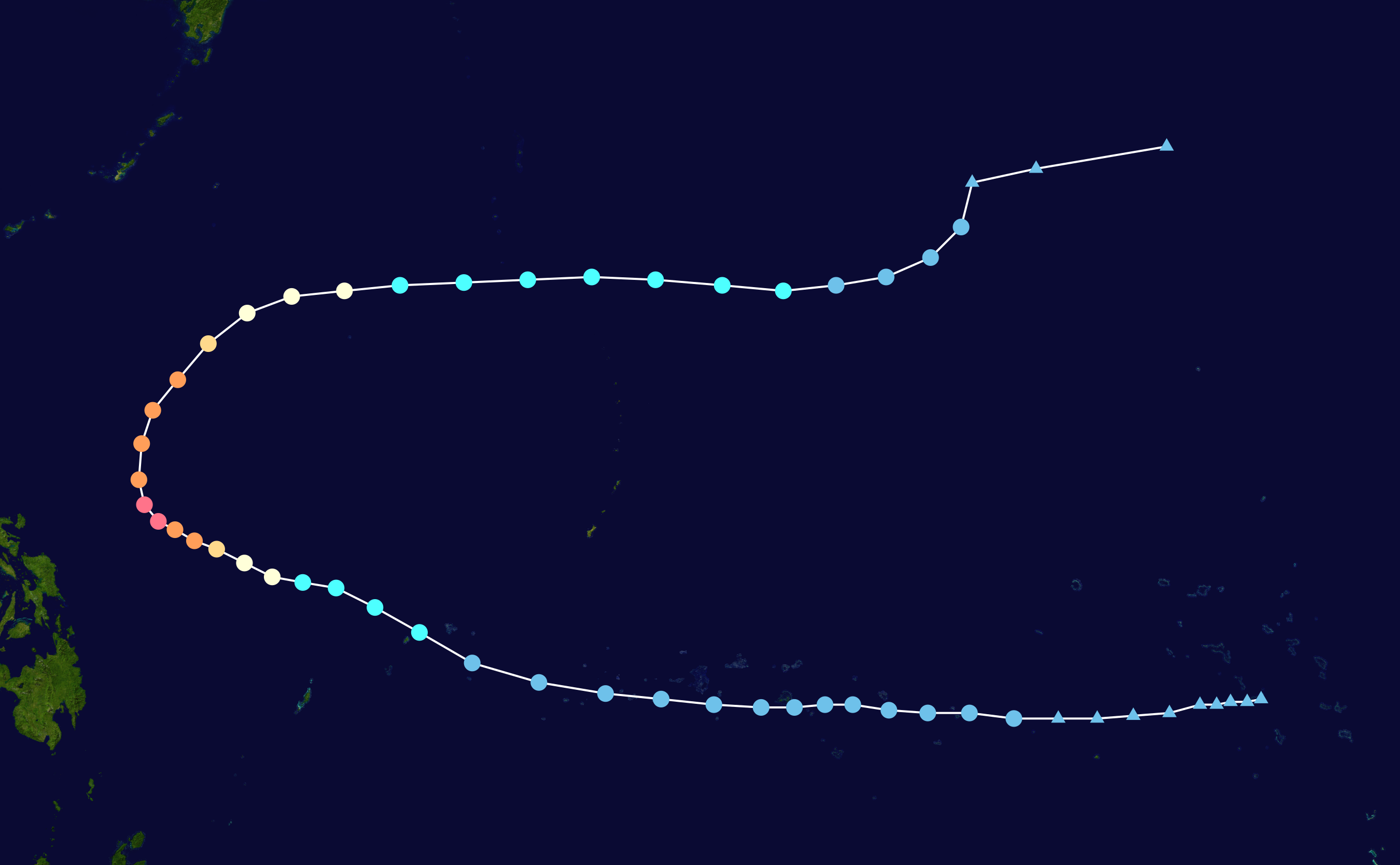
- Duration: November 28 – December 7
- Peak intensity: 205 km/h (125 mph) (10-min); 920 hPa (mbar)

Typhoon Lucy (Walding) was a powerful Category 4 super typhoon in the 1977 Pacific typhoon season. It formed in late November and reached peak intensity with 125 mph (205 km/h) winds and a minimum pressure of 920 hPa. Though it recurved and did not directly make landfall in the Philippines, it still brought heavy rains and strong winds to parts of the country, causing significant damage and loss of life.

=== Typhoon Mary (Yeyeng) ===
- Very strong typhoon (JMA)
- Category 2 typhoon (SSHWS)
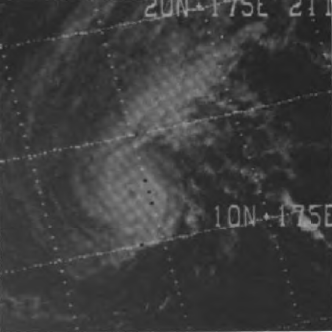
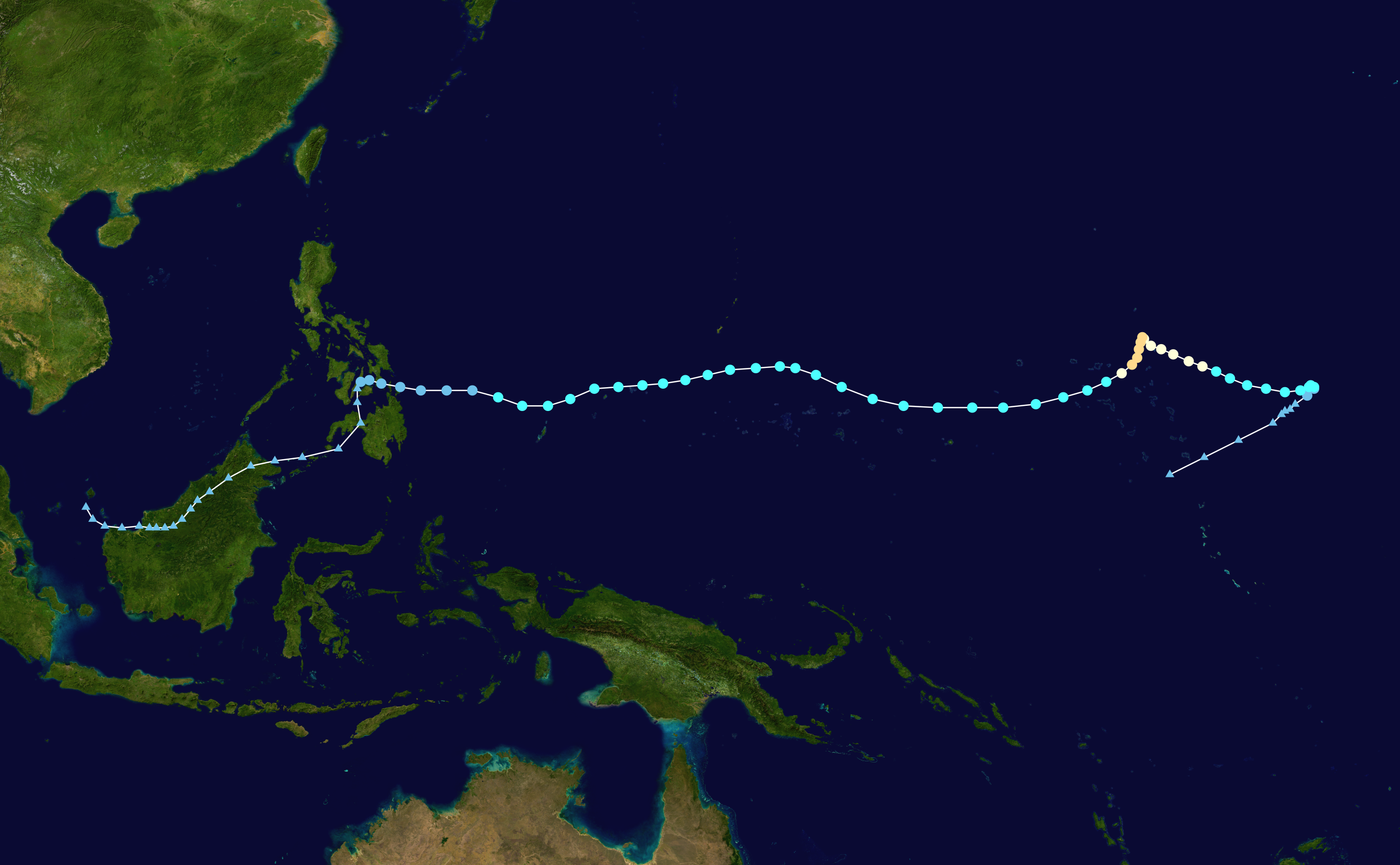
- Duration: December 20, 1977 – January 3, 1978
- Peak intensity: 155 km/h (100 mph) (10-min); 945 hPa (mbar)

Typhoon Mary (Yeyeng) formed in the western Pacific Ocean in late 1977. It reached peak intensity as a Category 2 typhoon with winds of 100 mph (160 km/h). The typhoon impacted the Marshall Islands and the Philippines, causing significant damage and loss of life, particularly in the Philippines. It was a powerful storm that left a lasting impact on the affected regions.

=== Other systems ===
- Tropical Depression Narsing formed in the western Pacific Ocean in 1977. It was a short-lived system that did not intensify into a tropical storm. The depression brought minimal impact to land and caused no significant damage or loss of life. It only lasted two days.
- Tropical Depression Tasing formed in the western Pacific Ocean in 1977. It remained at sea and did not make landfall, affecting no one. The storm eventually dissipated without causing any significant impact.

== Storm names ==
Western North Pacific tropical cyclones were named by the Joint Typhoon Warning Center prior to 2000. The first 20 names slated for use in the season are listed below, with only one remaining unused.

Patsy	Ruth	Sarah	Thelma	Vera
Wanda	Amy	Babe	Carla	Dinah
Emma	Freda	Gilda	Harriet	Ivy
Jean	Kim	Lucy	Mary	Nadine (unused)

=== Philippines ===
Atring	Bining	Kuring	Daling	Elang
Goring	Huling	Ibiang	Luming	Miling
Narsing	Openg	Pining	Rubing	Saling
Tasing	Unding	Walding	Yeyeng	
Auxiliary list
				Anding (unused)
Binang (unused)	Kadiang (unused)	Dinang (unused)	Epang (unused)	Gundang (unused)

The Philippine Atmospheric, Geophysical and Astronomical Services Administration uses its own naming scheme for tropical cyclones in their area of responsibility. PAGASA assigns names to tropical depressions that form within their area of responsibility and any tropical cyclone that might move into their area of responsibility. Should the list of names for a given year prove to be insufficient, names are taken from an auxiliary list, the first 6 of which are published each year before the season starts. Names not retired from this list will be used again in the 1981 season. This is the same list used for the 1973 season. PAGASA uses its own naming scheme that starts in the Filipino alphabet, with names of Filipino female names ending with "ng" (A, B, K, D, etc.). Names that were not assigned/going to use are marked in gray.

=== Retirement ===
Due to its impacts in the Philippines, PAGASA later retired the name Unding and was replaced by Unsing for the 1981 season. However, the name Unding would later be reused in the 2004 season, only for it to be re-retired by PAGASA due to its effects in Luzon.

== Season effects ==
This table will list all the storms that developed in the northwestern Pacific Ocean west of the International Date Line and north of the equator during 1977. It will include their intensity, duration, name, areas affected, deaths, missing persons (in parentheses), and damage totals. Classification and intensity values will be based on estimations conducted by the JMA. All damage figures will be in 1977 USD. Damages and deaths from a storm will include when the storm was a precursor wave or an extratropical low.

Name	Dates	Peak intensity			Areas affected	Damage (USD)	Deaths	Ref(s).
Name	Dates	Category	Wind speed	Pressure	Areas affected	Damage (USD)	Deaths	Ref(s).
Atring	January 10–15	Tropical depression	55 km/h (35 mph)	1,004 hPa (29.65 inHg)	Philippines	Unknown	None	
Patsy	March 27–31	Severe tropical storm	95 km/h (60 mph)	990 hPa (29.23 inHg)	Marshall Islands	None	None	
02W (Bining)	May 25–27	Tropical depression	55 km/h (35 mph)	1,002 hPa (29.59 inHg)	None	None	None	
TD	May 28–30	Tropical depression	Not specified	1,006 hPa (29.71 inHg)	Mariana Islands	None	None	
TD	June 12	Tropical depression	Not specified	1,008 hPa (29.77 inHg)	Philippines	None	None	
Ruth (Kuring)	June 13–17	Severe tropical storm	110 km/h (70 mph)	975 hPa (28.79 inHg)	Philippines, China, Taiwan	Unknown	Unknown	
TD	June 26–27	Tropical depression	Not specified	1,007 hPa (29.74 inHg)	None	None	None	
04W (Daling)	July 3–6	Tropical depression	55 km/h (35 mph)	994 hPa (29.35 inHg)	South China	None	None	
TD	July 4	Tropical depression	Not specified	1,008 hPa (29.77 inHg)	Philippines	None	None	
Sarah (Elang)	July 14–22	Typhoon	130 km/h (80 mph)	970 hPa (28.64 inHg)	Palau, Philippines, South China, Vietnam	Unknown	Unknown	
TD	July 14–15	Tropical depression	Not specified	1,006 hPa (29.71 inHg)	Philippines	None	None	
TD	July 14–18	Tropical depression	Not specified	1,004 hPa (29.65 inHg)	Caroline Islands	None	None	
Thelma (Goring)	July 19–27	Typhoon	130 km/h (80 mph)	950 hPa (28.05 inHg)	Philippines, Taiwan, China	$629 million	33	
Vera (Huling)	July 25 – August 2	Typhoon	205 km/h (125 mph)	925 hPa (27.32 inHg)	Ryukyu Islands, Taiwan, China	Unknown	25	
Wanda	July 30 – August 7	Tropical storm	75 km/h (45 mph)	985 hPa (29.09 inHg)	None	None	None	
TD	July 30	Tropical depression	Not specified	1,002 hPa (29.59 inHg)	None	None	None	
TD	August 10	Tropical depression	Not specified	996 hPa (29.41 inHg)	None	None	None	
TD	August 12	Tropical depression	Not specified	998 hPa (29.47 inHg)	Mariana Islands	None	None	
TD	August 13–18	Tropical depression	Not specified	996 hPa (29.41 inHg)	Japan	None	None	
TD	August 14–18	Tropical depression	Not specified	994 hPa (29.35 inHg)	None	None	None	
TD	August 14–15	Tropical depression	Not specified	1,004 hPa (29.65 inHg)	None	None	None	
Amy (Ibiang)	August 16–25	Severe tropical storm	110 km/h (70 mph)	980 hPa (28.94 inHg)	Philippines, Taiwan, Ryukyu Islands, Japan	Unknown	Unknown	
TD	August 17–20	Tropical depression	Not specified	1,004 hPa (29.65 inHg)	None	None	None	
TD	August 20–21	Tropical depression	Not specified	996 hPa (29.41 inHg)	Ryukyu Islands	None	None	
Eight	August 21–22	Tropical storm	75 km/h (45 mph)	988 hPa (29.18 inHg)	Japan	None	None	
TD	August 21	Tropical depression	Not specified	996 hPa (29.41 inHg)	Japan	None	None	
TD	August 27–28	Tropical depression	Not specified	1,000 hPa (29.53 inHg)	None	None	None	
Carla (Luming)	August 31 – September 6	Tropical storm	65 km/h (40 mph)	990 hPa (29.23 inHg)	Philippines, Vietnam, Laos	Unknown	None	
Babe (Miling)	August 31 – September 12	Typhoon	205 km/h (125 mph)	905 hPa (26.72 inHg)	Caroline Islands, Ryukyu Islands, East China	$23 million	23	
TD	September 7–9	Tropical depression	Not specified	996 hPa (29.41 inHg)	Japan	None	None	
TD	September 8	Tropical depression	Not specified	1,004 hPa (29.65 inHg)	Vietnam	None	None	
TD	September 10	Tropical depression	Not specified	1,002 hPa (29.59 inHg)	Caroline Islands	None	None	
Dinah (Openg)	September 11–26	Typhoon	130 km/h (80 mph)	965 hPa (28.50 inHg)	Philippines, Vietnam, Laos, Cambodia	Unknown	54	
TD	September 11–12	Tropical depression	Not specified	1,004 hPa (29.65 inHg)	None	None	None	
TD	September 11–12	Tropical depression	Not specified	1,002 hPa (29.59 inHg)	Caroline Islands	None	None	
Emma	September 12–21	Severe tropical storm	110 km/h (70 mph)	965 hPa (28.50 inHg)	Mariana Islands, Japan	None	None	
Narsing	September 12–13	Tropical depression	45 km/h (30 mph)	1,002 hPa (29.59 inHg)	Philippines	None	None	
Freda (Pining)	September 21–25	Severe tropical storm	100 km/h (60 mph)	980 hPa (28.94 inHg)	Philippines, South China	None	1	
TD	September 26–29	Tropical depression	Not specified	1,008 hPa (29.77 inHg)	Ryukyu Islands	None	None	
TD	September 29	Tropical depression	Not specified	1,008 hPa (29.77 inHg)	None	None	None	
Gilda	October 3–9	Typhoon	120 km/h (75 mph)	965 hPa (28.50 inHg)	None	None	Nonr	
TD	October 8	Tropical depression	Not specified	1,008 hPa (29.77 inHg)	None	None	None	
Fifteen	October 11–13	Tropical storm	75 km/h (45 mph)	990 hPa (29.23 inHg)	Japan	None	None	
Rubing	October 11–15	Tropical depression	55 km/h (35 mph)	1,004 hPa (29.65 inHg)	Mariana Islands	None	None	
Harriet (Saling)	October 14–20	Severe tropical storm	100 km/h (60 mph)	980 hPa (28.94 inHg)	None	None	None	
Ivy	October 18–27	Typhoon	150 km/h (95 mph)	950 hPa (28.05 inHg)	Mariana Islands	None	None	
Jean	October 28 – November 5	Typhoon	120 km/h (75 mph)	970 hPa (28.64 inHg)	None	None	None	
TD	October 30–31	Tropical depression	Not specified	1,008 hPa (29.77 inHg)	None	None	None	
Tasing	November 3–5	Tropical depression	45 km/h (30 mph)	1,008 hPa (29.77 inHg)	None	Unknown	Unknown	
Kim (Unding)	November 4–17	Typhoon	120 km/h (75 mph)	920 hPa (27.17 inHg)	Mariana Islands, Philippines	$2.04 million	102	
TD	November 15–17	Tropical depression	Not specified	1,006 hPa (29.71 inHg)	None	None	None	
TD	November 24	Tropical depression	Not specified	1,010 hPa (29.83 inHg)	Philippines	None	None	
Lucy (Walding)	November 28 – December 9	Typhoon	205 km/h (125 mph)	920 hPa (27.17 inHg)	Caroline Islands	None	None	
Mary (Yeyeng)	December 18, 1977 – January 3, 1978	Typhoon	155 km/h (95 mph)	945 hPa (27.91 inHg)	Marshall Islands, Caroline Islands, Philippines, Malaysia, Indonesia	Unknown	Unknown	
Season aggregates
54 systems	January 10, 1977 – January 3 1978		205 km/h (125 mph)	905 hPa (26.72 inHg)		>$654 million	>238	

== See also ==
- List of Pacific typhoon seasons
- 1977 Pacific hurricane season
- 1977 Atlantic hurricane season
- 1977 North Indian Ocean cyclone season
- South-West Indian Ocean cyclone seasons: 1976–77, 1977–78
- Australian region cyclone seasons: 1976–77, 1977–78
- South Pacific cyclone seasons: 1976–77, 1977–78
