= List of named storms (U) =

Storms are named for historical reasons to avoid confusion when communicating with the public, as more than one storm can exist at a time. Names are drawn in order from predetermined lists. For tropical cyclones, names are assigned when a system has one-, three-, or ten-minute winds of more than 65 km/h (40 mph). Standards, however, vary from basin to basin. For example, some tropical depressions are named in the Western Pacific, while within the Australian and Southern Pacific regions, the naming of tropical cyclones are delayed until they have gale-force winds occurring more than halfway around the storm center.

This list covers the letter U.

== Storms ==
Note: † indicates the name was retired after that usage in the respective basin

- Ubá (2021) — subtropical cyclone that dumped heavy rains in Southeastern Brazil, caused 15 deaths
- Uding

- 1966 – strong tropical storm, hit the Philippines; also known as Nancy beyond the Philippine Area of Responsibility (PAR)
- 1970 – strong tropical storm, made landfall in the Philippines Islands; also known as Louise beyond the (PAR)
- 1974 – Category 2-equivalent typhoon, passed near the Philippines; also known as Della beyond the (PAR)
- 1977 – powerful Category 4 typhoon, heavy rains caused flash flooding that left 55 people dead with widespread damage; also known as Kim beyond the (PAR)
- 1978 – formed west of the Philippines and struck Vietnam; also known as Kit beyond the (PAR)
- 1982 – Category 5 super typhoon, struck Guam as a tropical storm before nearing the Philippines and Japan; also known as Mac beyond the (PAR)
- 1986 – killed two people while crossing the central Philippines; also known as Ida beyond the (PAR)
- 1994 – Category 3 typhoon, struck Taiwan and Fujian; also known as Gladys beyond the (PAR)

- Uesi (2020) – a Category 3 severe tropical cyclone that minimal affected New Caledonia.
- Ula (2015)† – long-lived and powerful Category 4 cyclone, affected Tonga, Fiji, and Vanuatu.
- Uleki (1988) – long-lived Category 3 Hurricane in the Central Pacific and typhoon in the Western Pacific; caused high surf in Hawaii that killed two people.
- Ulika (2016) – Category 1 hurricane, churned in the open Central Pacific
- Ulpiang

- 1996 – typhoon that passed south of Japan; also known as Dale beyond the (PAR)
- 2000 – tropical depression that moved through the Philippines, killing 3 people

- Ului (2010)† – Category 5 tropical cyclone that passed through the Solomon Islands and later struck eastern Australia.
- Ulysses

- 2008 – Category 2-equivalent typhoon, sank a cargo passenger ship, killing at least 47 people; also known as Dolphin beyond the (PAR)
- 2020† – destructive Category 4-equivalent typhoon, made landfall on Luzon and in Vietnam; also known as Vamco beyond the (PAR)

- Uma (1987)† – killed 50 people when it struck the island of Vanuatu
- Una

- 1965 – short-lived cyclone, passed south of Christmas Island
- 1973 – a Category 2 tropical cyclone that made landfall Queensland

- Unala (2013) – storm that churned in the open Central Pacific.
- Undang

- 1964 – Category 1-equivalent typhoon, interacted with the larger Typhoon Kathy; also known as Marie beyond the (PAR)
- 1972 – Category 3-equivalent typhoon, killed 90 people in the Philippines and Vietnam; also known as Therese beyond the (PAR)
- 1976 – depression that did not make landfall
- 1980 – Category 4 typhoon, struck Taiwan and Fujian; also known as Percy beyond the (PAR)
- 1984† – Category 4 typhoon, killed over 1,000 people when it moved through the Philippines and Vietnam; also known as Agnes beyond the (PAR)

- Unding

- 1965 – Category 3-equivalent typhoon, brushed northern Luzon before striking southern China; also known as Rose beyond the (PAR)
- 1977† – Category 4 typhoon, killed over 100 people in the Philippines; also known as Kim beyond the (PAR)
- 2004† – Category 4 typhoon, affected the Philippines, Vietnam, Thailand, Myanmar and Malaysia; also known as Muifa beyond the (PAR)

- Unsang (1988)† – Category 4 typhoon, made landfall along the central portion of Luzon and later on, on Hainan Island; also known as Ruby beyond the (PAR)
- Unsing

- 1981 – crossed the Philippines and struck Vietnam; also known as Fabian beyond the (PAR)
- 1985 – Category 3 typhoon, threatened Luzon but turned north and eastward out to sea; also known as Hope beyond the (PAR)
- 1989 – Category 2 typhoon, hit the Philippines; also known as Hunt beyond the (PAR)
- 1993 – weak tropical storm, hit Japan; also known as Zola beyond the (PAR)

- Upana (2000) – short-lived storm south of Hawaii, redeveloped in the western Pacific Ocean.
- Upia (2002)† – short-lived cyclone east of Papua New Guinea
- Urduja

- 2009 – short-lived depression, developed east of Mindanao
- 2013 – Category 5 typhoon, passed southeast of Okinawa and mainland Japan; also known as Francisco beyond the (PAR)
- 2017† – traversed the Visayas region of the Philippines, causing more than ₱1 billion worth of damage; also known as Kai-tak beyond the (PAR)

- Uriah

- 2007 – extratropical cyclone, exacerbated already severe flooding in Northern England
- 2016 – Category 4 tropical cyclone moved across the open southern Indian Ocean.

- Uring

- 1967 – Category 3-equivalent typhoon, struck Kyushu; also known as Dinah beyond the (PAR)
- 1971 – Category 4 typhoon, struck Luzon and later Hong Kong and East china; also known as Rose beyond the (PAR)
- 1979 – Category 3 typhoon, struck Palawan Island and Vietnam; also known as Sarah beyond the (PAR)
- 1983 – Category 5 super typhoon, approached then curved northeast away from the Philippines; also known as Marge beyond the (PAR)
- 1991† – tropical storm, struck the Philippines killing at least 5,081 people; also known as Thelma beyond the (PAR)

- Urmil

- 2006 – short lived tropical cyclone, caused minor damage on Tonga.
- 2026 – a Category 2 tropical cyclone that affected Vanuatu and New Caledonia.

- Ursula

- 1945 – Category 2-equivalent typhoon, made landfall on Taiwan and in China
- 1971 – Category 2-equivalent tropical cyclone, did not affect land
- 1998† – Category 1-equivalent tropical cyclone, passed through the Tuamotu Islands
- 2003 – tropical depression, crossed Palawan
- 2019† – Category 3-equivalent typhoon, struck the Philippines resulting in at least 50 deaths and $67.2 million (2019 USD) in damages; also known as Phanfone beyond the (PAR)

- Usagi

- 2001 – weak but deadly storm, impacted Vietnam and Thailand
- 2007 – Category 4 typhoon, struck Japan while weakening
- 2013 – violent typhoon which affected Taiwan, the Philippines, China and Hong Kong; also known as Odette within the (PAR)
- 2018 – Category 2 typhoon, affected the Philippines and southern Vietnam; also known as Samuel within the (PAR)
- 2024† – a Category 4 super typhoon that struck the Philippines and Taiwan; also known as Ofel within the (PAR)

- Usha (1994) – moved through Vanuatu.
- Usman (2018)† – tropical depression, brought torrential rainfall and flooding to much of Visayas, killing 156 people and causing ₱5.41 billion damage
- Utor

- 2001 – Category 1 typhoon, passed north of Luzon and struck Guangdong, killing 203 people; also known as known as Feria within the (PAR)
- 2006 – Category 3 typhoon, swept through the central Philippines a few weeks after the deadly Typhoon Durian; also known as Seniang within the (PAR)
- 2013† – Category 4 super typhoon, struck Luzon and southern China; also known as known as Labuyo within the (PAR)

- Uwan (2025)† – a very large Category 4 typhoon that made landfall in the Philippines and Taiwan.

== See also ==
- Tropical cyclone naming
- List of historical tropical cyclone names
