= Typhoon Muifa (2004) =

Pacific typhoon in 2004

Typhoon Muifa (Unding)
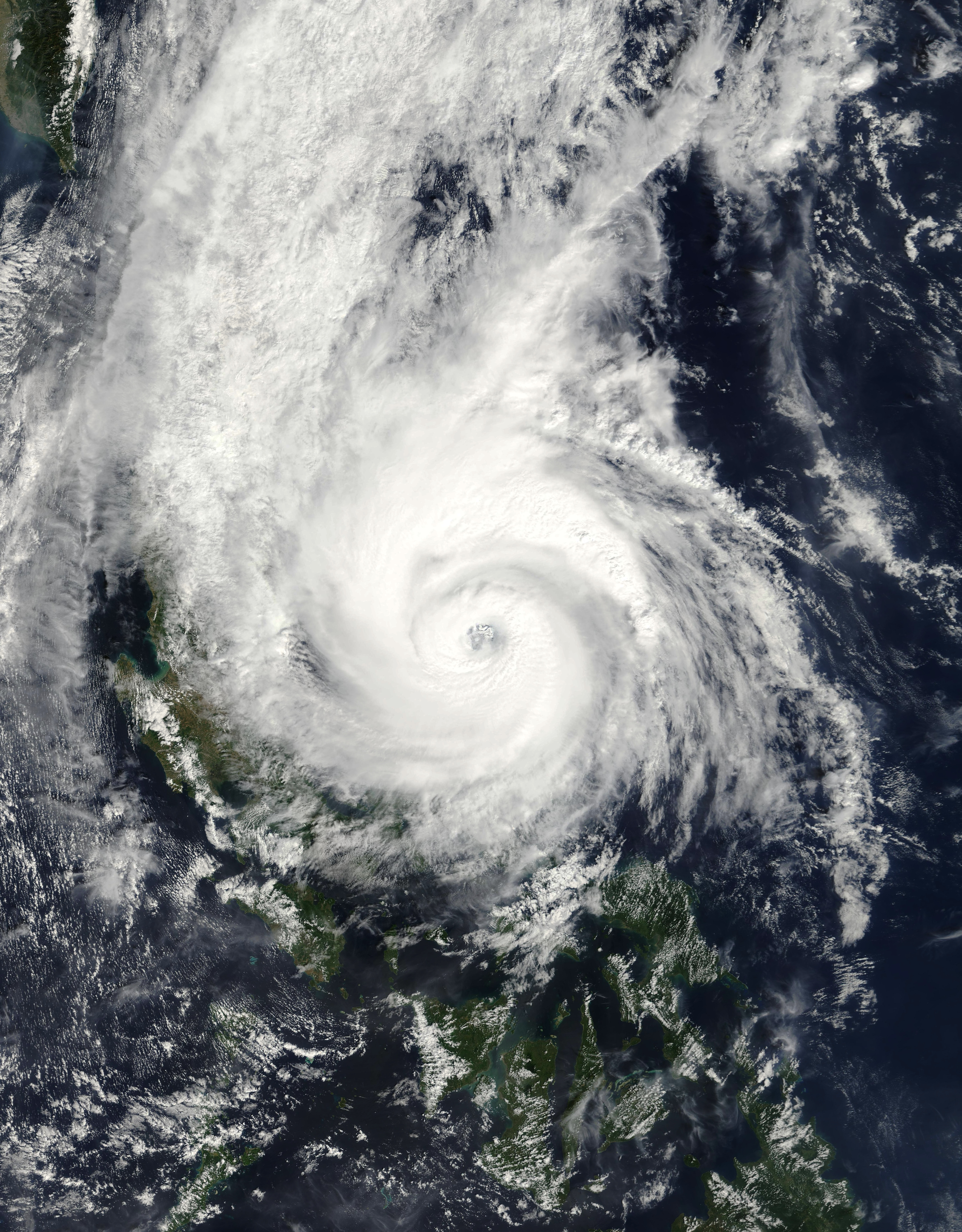
- Typhoon Muifa intensifying off the Philippines on November 18

Meteorological history
- Formed: November 14, 2004
- Dissipated: November 26, 2004

Typhoon
- 10-minute sustained (JMA)
- Highest winds: 150 km/h (90 mph)
- Lowest pressure: 950 hPa (mbar); 28.05 inHg

Category 4-equivalent typhoon
- 1-minute sustained (SSHWS/JTWC)
- Highest winds: 215 km/h (130 mph)
- Lowest pressure: 927 hPa (mbar); 27.37 inHg

Overall effects
- Fatalities: 108 direct
- Damage: $18 million (2004 USD)
- Areas affected: Philippines, Vietnam, Thailand, Myanmar, Malaysia
- IBTrACS
- Part of the 2004 Pacific typhoon season

Typhoon Muifa, (Note: The name Muifa (Cantonese: 梅花, [muːi˨˩ faː˥]) was contributed by Macau and means plum blossom (Prunus mume) in Cantonese.) known in the Philippines as Typhoon Unding, was a strong typhoon during the 2004 Pacific typhoon season.

The first of four consecutive tropical cyclones to strike the Philippines, a tropical disturbance became Tropical Depression 29W on November 14 and strengthened into Tropical Storm Muifa early on the 15th when centered east-southeast of Manila, the Philippines. Muifa turned back onto a west-northwest heading and intensified. It reached typhoon intensity on the 17th just prior to beginning a two-day clockwise loop. Late on the 18th, Muifa's intensity peaked at 130 mph (115 knots), still to the east of the Philippines. Unding, as PAGASA named it, made landfall very late on the 19th near Naga City with maximum winds of 80 mph (70 kn). The storm briefly lost typhoon strength for a day until it regained typhoon intensity in the South China Sea on the 21st. Muifa held onto typhoon status until late on the 23rd when it weakened to a tropical storm once more. By early on the 26th, a weakening Tropical Depression Muifa was located 250 nm south of Bangkok, Thailand. Later that day Muifa turned northward into an environment of increased wind shear and dissipated 120 nautical miles (220 km) south-southwest of Bangkok.

The highest 24-hour rainfall amount from the Philippines was 246.4 mm at Catanduanes between midday the 15th and 16th. The death toll reported from the Philippines was 68 dead, 160 injured, and 69 unaccounted for. A total of 26,238 houses were destroyed and 76,062 damaged; total damage reached $1.01 billion pesos ($17.96 million 2004 USD). The highest 24-hour rainfall amount reported in Thailand was 251.5 mm at the Prachuap Khiri Khan airport between the afternoon of the 25th and 26th. Floods and landslides triggered by the typhoon killed about 40 people, and 42 more people were reported missing.

== Meteorological history ==
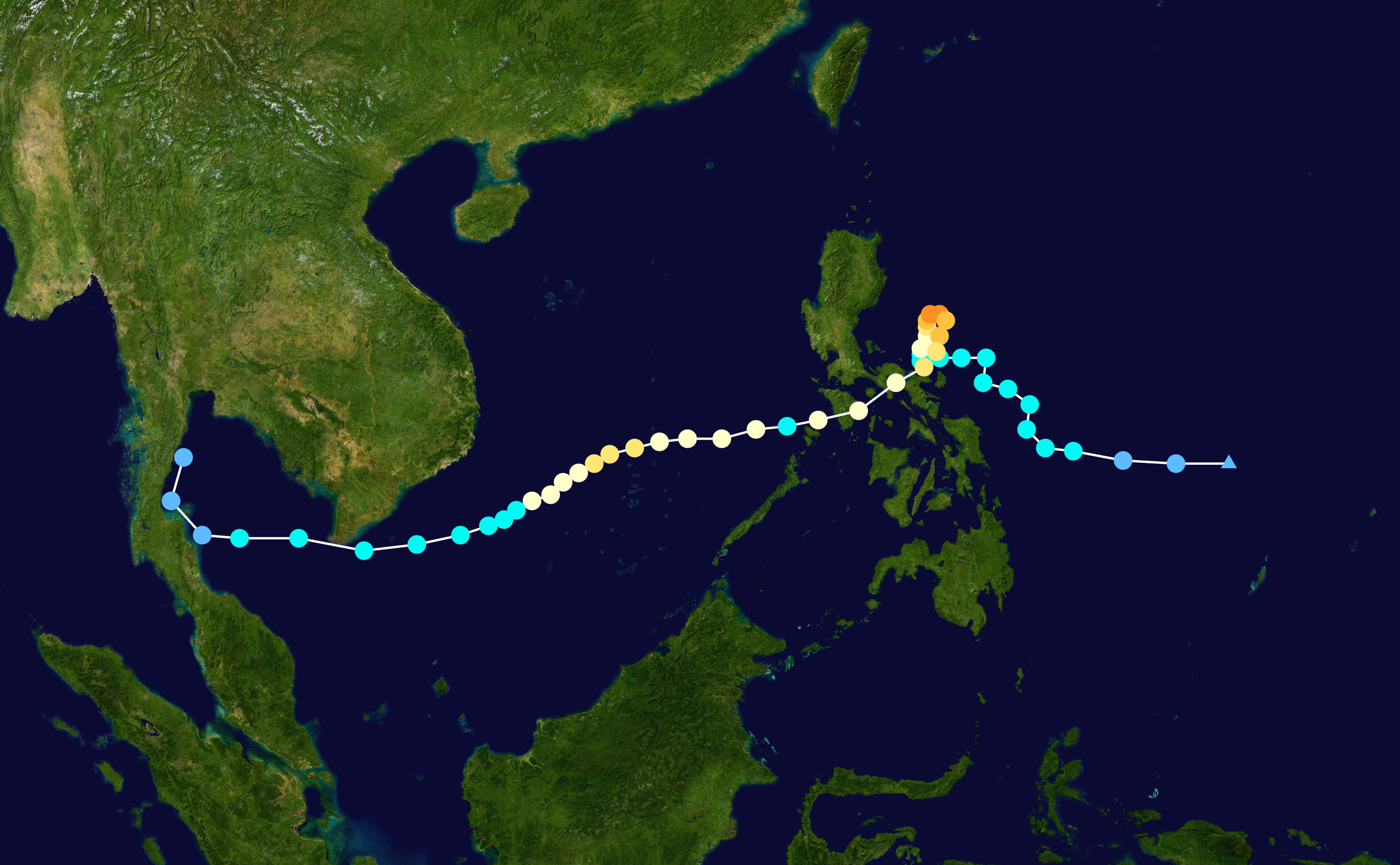
Map plotting the storm's track and intensity, according to the Saffir–Simpson scale Map key Saffir–Simpson scale Tropical depression (≤38 mph, ≤62 km/h) Tropical storm (39–73 mph, 63–118 km/h) Category 1 (74–95 mph, 119–153 km/h) Category 2 (96–110 mph, 154–177 km/h) Category 3 (111–129 mph, 178–208 km/h) Category 4 (130–156 mph, 209–251 km/h) Category 5 (≥157 mph, ≥252 km/h) Unknown Storm type Tropical cyclone Subtropical cyclone Extratropical cyclone, remnant low, tropical disturbance, or monsoon depression

The disturbance that was to become Muifa can be traced back to the afternoon of November 12, when a weak low-pressure system formed over the Western Marianas. It became Tropical Depression 29W on November 14 and strengthened into a tropical storm while moving north-northwestward by early November 15, when centered 550 miles (890 km) east-southeast of Manila, Philippines. PAGASA assigned the name Unding to the cyclone on the 14th as it passed the 135th meridian.

The storm's forward speed suddenly decreased from 28 km/h to 13 km/h when it entered an area of weak steering flow in between a high-pressure ridge in development centered over China and a high-pressure ridge weakening south of Japan. On the 16th, the tropical cyclone started drifting north-northeast. Muifa turned back onto a west-northwest heading and intensified. It reached typhoon intensity on the 17th just prior to beginning a two-day clockwise loop. Late on the 18th, Muifa's intensity peaked at 130 mph (115 knots) with a minimum central pressure of 955 mbar (hPa), still to the east of the Philippines.

Muifa made landfall very late on the 19th near Naga City with maximum winds of 80 mph (70 kn). The system ambled across the Philippine Archipelago, dropping down to tropical storm intensity on the afternoon of the 20th. Shortly after Unding left the country, on the 22nd, Tropical Depression Merbok (Violeta) passed over Luzon. Only five days after that, Tropical Depression Winnie hit Luzon. Luzon was hit a third time by Typhoon Nanmadol on December 2. The Philippines being struck by four tropical systems so close together is a very rare event, and also very damaging.

On the 21st, Muifa regained typhoon intensity in the South China Sea. Now moving west-southwest, early on the 22nd Muifa re-strengthened into a 105 mph (91 kn) typhoon 440 miles (710 km) east of Ho Chi Minh City, Vietnam. Muifa held onto typhoon status until late on the 23rd when its weakened to a tropical storm once more. At this point, it was forecast by the JTWC that Muifa would strike the southern tip of Vietnam with 65 mph (56 kn) sustained winds. From there, it would restrengthen to typhoon strength and pass over Thailand and enter the Indian Ocean, slowly weakening as it heads into the Bay of Bengal. This did not happen, though.

On the 25th, Tropical Storm Muifa accelerated westward at a 23 mph (20 kn) clip. By early on the 26th, a weakening Tropical Depression Muifa was located 250 nm south of Bangkok, Thailand. It was still forecast by the JTWC that the depression would enter the Andaman Sea, though much weaker than it was previously forecast, and later strike India as a 40 mph (35 kn) tropical cyclone. Once again, this did not occur. Later that day, Muifa turned northward instead and entered an environment of increased wind shear and dissipated 120 nm south-southwest of Bangkok. But according to the Thailand Meteorological Department (TMD) advisories, Tropical Depression Muifa made landfall near Amphoe Ko Pha Ngan, Surat Thani Province at around 1500 UTC on the 25th with winds of 35 mph (30 kn).

== Preparations ==
Clark Air Base, an American air base on Luzon, had some 70 United States Marines and others evacuated to Okinawa via plane. Almost 3,000 people were stranded in various places in the Philippines because the ferry crossings between Bicol and the central islands of the Philippines were forbidden to any vessel under 1,000 tons during the storm.

The Vietnamese government issued protective orders asking Petrovietnam, an oil monopoly, to watch over oil drilling facilities. The facilities were also modified to withstand the typhoon. All but a few of the workers were evacuated before the storm came. Boats were also urged to return to shore somewhere else safe. Off-shore fishing also became forbidden. Youths in schools in Cà Mau province had as many days off as needed.

Over 3,000 people from Loi Quan Island in the Go Cong Dong District were evacuated to safer areas or shelters when asked by the government.

A United States-owned gas firm in the Gulf of Thailand, Unocal Corporationss, was forced to shut down and evacuate at least 781 people from the firm.

== Impact ==
=== Philippines ===
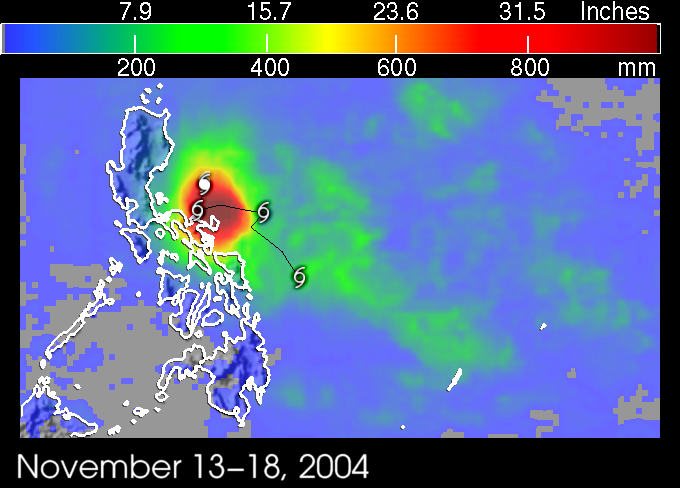
Rainfall from Muifa from November 13 to the 18th

There was an area of extreme rainfall measuring possibly 40 inches (1,000 mm) just east off the coast of southern Luzon. Much of southern Luzon and other portions of central Philippines received rainfall between 10 and 20 inches (510 mm). Catanduanes and extreme southeastern Luzon might have been blanketed in as much as 35 inches (890 mm) of rain though. Naga City only received a total of 8.26 inches (210 mm) of rainfall, but it was enough to flood some low-lying areas. The highest 24-hour rainfall amount from the Philippines was 246.4 mm at Catanduanes between midday on the 15th and 16th. The passing of four cyclones in a short period of time as mentioned above caused a great deal of damage. Over 1,400 people either died or were missing, mostly from Winnie. Rainfall from all systems was extremely high.

The lowest pressure at Naga City was 986.1 mb early on the 16th. Because of the high rainfall, over 3,000 people had to be evacuated from the lowlands. A wind gust of 130 km/h (80 mph) coming from the north was measured in Naga City.

The death toll reported from the Philippines was 68 dead, 160 injured, and 69 unaccounted for. Most of the casualties were adults, but two infants succumbed to hypothermia, as did an elderly man in Catanduanes. Another twelve of those people were killed by a tornado associated with the storm that ripped through the coastal towns in Oriental Mindoro province. A total of 26,238 houses were destroyed and 76,062 damaged, with 40 of those homes being in Catanduanes. Some areas reported 80% of the trees and electricity posts were destroyed. Total damage in the Philippines reached 1.01 billion pesos ($17.96 million 2004 USD, November 26, 2004 exchange rate). At least fifteen provinces were affected by Unding.

=== Vietnam ===
Typhoon Muifa had a very devastating impact on Vietnam. The highest 24-hour rainfall amount reported was 251.5 mm at Prachuap Khirikhan between the afternoon of the 25th and 26th. Flooding from the torrential rains was seen in the low-lying places in and around the city of Huế and nearby districts.

The cyclone caused the 14 houses to collapse. An additional 85 home's roofs were blown off in Cà Mau. Approximately 500 square kilometres of paddy rice, shrimp, and fruit trees were annihilated. In the Bạc Liêu province, 34 houses fell, and another 90 or more were damaged to some degree. Five houses in the Kiên Giang province were damaged and three fishing vessels sank off the coast. Hội An, which is the town that was declared a world heritage site, was hit by the flood and submerged in more than 6 feet (1.8 meters) of water, and more than 83 old houses were in danger of collapse. In all, over 170,000 houses in five provinces were submerged partially.

Floods and landslides triggered by the typhoon killed about 40 people, and 42 more people were declared missing. At least three people were injured in the Bạc Liêu province, while one fisherman was reported missing in Kiên Giang.

== Aftermath ==
There were many relief operations setup throughout the Philippines very shortly after the cyclone moved into the South China Sea. The Philippine National Red Cross (PNRC) also mobilized 15 disaster response teams quickly. All together, there were about 1,000 volunteers helping the evacuation of the disaster-stricken families and in the initial relief operation. Two hundred sacks of rice and vegetables seeds were distributed by Gloria Macapagal Arroyo, president of the Philippines, throughout Oriental Mindoro.

The Philippine president also released a total of $5 million pesos for cleaning up in Oriental Mindoro on November 25. $3 million pesos went to rebuilding homes in Roxas. The other $2 million pesos went to the provincial government's relief and rehabilitation efforts. A member of the country's congress also gave $10 million pesos to be used for the hoped speedy rehabilitation of the province.

Residents that were evacuated in the coastal communities of Vietnam returned home on the morning of November 25. The families whose homes were damaged began to receive emergency relief aid. But there were also many villages in the mountains which needed urgent relief but which could not be quickly reached.

=== Retirement ===
The name that PAGASA gave to Muifa, Unding, was retired following this storm; it was previously retired by PAGASA after Typhoon Kim in 1977, but the name was re-introduced to the revised list released by the weather bureau in 2001. It was replaced by Ulysses, which was first used during the 2008 season.

== See also ==
- Other tropical cyclones named Muifa
- Other tropical cyclones named Unding
- Typhoon Durian
- Typhoon Cimaron (2006)
- Typhoon Angela
- Tropical Storm Linda (1997)
