= List of storms named Unding =

The name Unding has been used for three tropical cyclones in the Philippine Area of Responsibility by PAGASA in the Western Pacific Ocean.

- Typhoon Rose (1965) (T6522, 27W, Unding) – approached the Philippines and struck China.
- Typhoon Kim (1977) (T7718, 19W, Unding) – struck the Northern Philippines.

The name Unding was retired following the 1977 Pacific typhoon season and was replaced with Unsing. However, it was later reintroduced in 2004.

- Typhoon Muifa (2004) (T0425, 29W, Unding) – Category 4 typhoon, affected the Philippines, Vietnam, Thailand, Myanmar, Malaysia

The name Unding was re-retired following the 2004 Pacific typhoon season and was replaced with Ulysses.
