= Usagi =

Usagi may refer to:

- Typhoon Usagi (disambiguation), one of several named tropical storms
- Usagi, a Japanese unisex name/unisex given name, used by several fictional characters:
  - Usagi Tsukino or Sailor Moon, the main character in Sailor Moon
  - Usagi "Chibiusa" Tsukino or Chibiusa, a character in Sailor Moon
  - Miyamoto Usagi, the main character in Usagi Yojimbo
  - Kuro Usagi, or Black Rabbit, one of the main characters from Problem Children Are Coming from Another World, Aren't They?
  - Usagi, a main character in Chiikawa
