= List of storms named Undang =

The name Undang was used for five tropical cyclones in the Philippine Area of Responsibility by PAGASA in the Western Pacific Ocean:

- Typhoon Marie (1964) (T6416, 20W, Undang) – Category 1-equivalent typhoon, interacted with the larger Typhoon Kathy.
- Typhoon Therese (1972) T7229, 36W, Undang) – Category 3-equivalent typhoon, killed 90 people in the Philippines and Vietnam.
- Tropical Depression Undang (1976) – depression that did not make landfall.
- Typhoon Percy (1980) (T8014, 19W, Undang) – Category 4 typhoon, struck Taiwan and Fujian.
- Typhoon Agnes (1984) (T8424, 27W, Undang) – Category 4 typhoon, killed over 1,000 people when it moved through the Philippines and Vietnam.

Undang was retired by PAGASA after the 1984 typhoon season and replaced with Unsang for the 1988 season.
