= List of storms named Ulpiang =

The name Ulpiang was used for two tropical cyclones in the Philippine Area of Responsibility by PAGASA in the Western Pacific Ocean:

- Typhoon Dale (1996) (T9626, 36W, Ulpiang) – typhoon that passed south of Japan.
- Tropical Depression Ulpiang (2000) – tropical depression that moved through the Philippines, killing 3 people
