= List of storms named Ursula =

The name Ursula has been used for five tropical cyclones worldwide, three in the Western North Pacific Ocean and two in the South Pacific Ocean.

In the Western North Pacific:

- Typhoon Ursula (1945) – Category 2-equivalent typhoon, made landfall on Taiwan and in China.
- Tropical Depression Ursula (2003) (22W) – crossed Palawan before dissipating.
- Typhoon Phanfone (2019) (T1929, 30W, Ursula) – Category 3-equivalent typhoon, struck the Philippines resulting in at least 50 deaths and $67.2 million (2019 USD) in damages.

The name Ursula was retired following the 2019 Pacific typhoon season and was replaced with Ugong, which refers to the roaring or howling sound of wind in Tagalog.

In the South Pacific:

- Cyclone Ursula (1971) – Category 2-equivalent tropical cyclone, did not affect land.
- Cyclone Ursula (1998) – Category 1-equivalent tropical cyclone, passed through French Polynesia's Tuamotu Islands.
