= List of storms named Uring =

The name Uring was used for four tropical cyclones in the Philippine Area of Responsibility by PAGASA in the Western Pacific Ocean.

- Typhoon Dinah (1967) (T6730, 37W, Uring) – Category 3-equivalent typhoon, struck Kyushu.
- Typhoon Rose (1971) (T7121, 21W, Uring) – Category 4 typhoon, struck Luzon and later Hong Kong and East china.
- Typhoon Sarah (1979) (T7919, 22W, Uring) – Category 3 typhoon, struck Palawan Island and Vietnam.
- Typhoon Marge (1983) – Category 5 super typhoon, approached then curved northeast away from the Philippines.
- Tropical Storm Thelma (1991) (T9125, 27W, Uring) – tropical storm, struck the Philippines killing at least 5,081 people.
