= List of storms named Uding =

The name Uding was used for eight tropical cyclones in the Philippine Area of Responsibility by PAGASA in the Western Pacific Ocean:

- Tropical Storm Nancy (1966) (T6633, 36W, Uding) – strong tropical storm, hit the Philippines.
- Typhoon Louise (1970) (T7021, 23W, Uding) – strong tropical storm, made landfall in the Philippines Islands.
- Typhoon Della (1974) (T7425, 29W, Uding) – Category 2-equivalent typhoon, passed near the Philippines.
- Tropical Storm Kit (1978) (T7820, 21W, Uding) – formed west of the Philippines and struck Vietnam.
- Typhoon Mac (1982) (T8221, 28W, Uding) – Category 5 super typhoon, struck Guam as a tropical storm before nearing the Philippines and Japan.
- Tropical Storm Ida (1986) (T8624, 21W, Uding) – killed two people while crossing the central Philippines.
- Typhoon Gladys (1994) (T9417, 20W, Uding) – Category 3 typhoon, struck Taiwan and Fujian.
