= List of storms named Uriah =

The name Uriah has been given to one tropical cyclone in the Southern Indian Ocean and to one extratropical cyclone in Great Britain.

In the Southern Indian Ocean:

- Cyclone Uriah (2016), Category 4 tropical cyclone, moved across the open ocean

In Great Britain:

- Cyclone Uriah (2007), extratropical low, exacerbated already severe flooding in Northern England
