= List of storms named Una =

The name Una has been used for two tropical cyclones in the Australian region of the Southern Hemisphere:

- Cyclone Una (1965) – a short-lived cyclone, passed south of Christmas Island.
- Cyclone Una (1973) – a Category 2 tropical cyclone that made landfall Queensland.
