= List of storms named Unsing =

The name Unsing was used for four tropical cyclones in the Philippine Area of Responsibility by PAGASA in the Western Pacific Ocean:

- Tropical Storm Fabian (1981) (T8123, 23W, Unsing) – crossed the Philippines and struck Vietnam.
- Typhoon Hope (1985) (T8526, 27W, Unsing) – Category 3 typhoon, threatened Luzon but turned north and eastward out to sea.
- Typhoon Hunt (1989) (T8930, 33W, Unsing) – Category 2 typhoon, hit the Philippines.
- Tropical Storm Zola (1993) (T9314, 20W, Unsing) – weak tropical storm, hit Japan.
