= Tropical Storm Usagi (2001) =

Pacific tropical storm in 2001

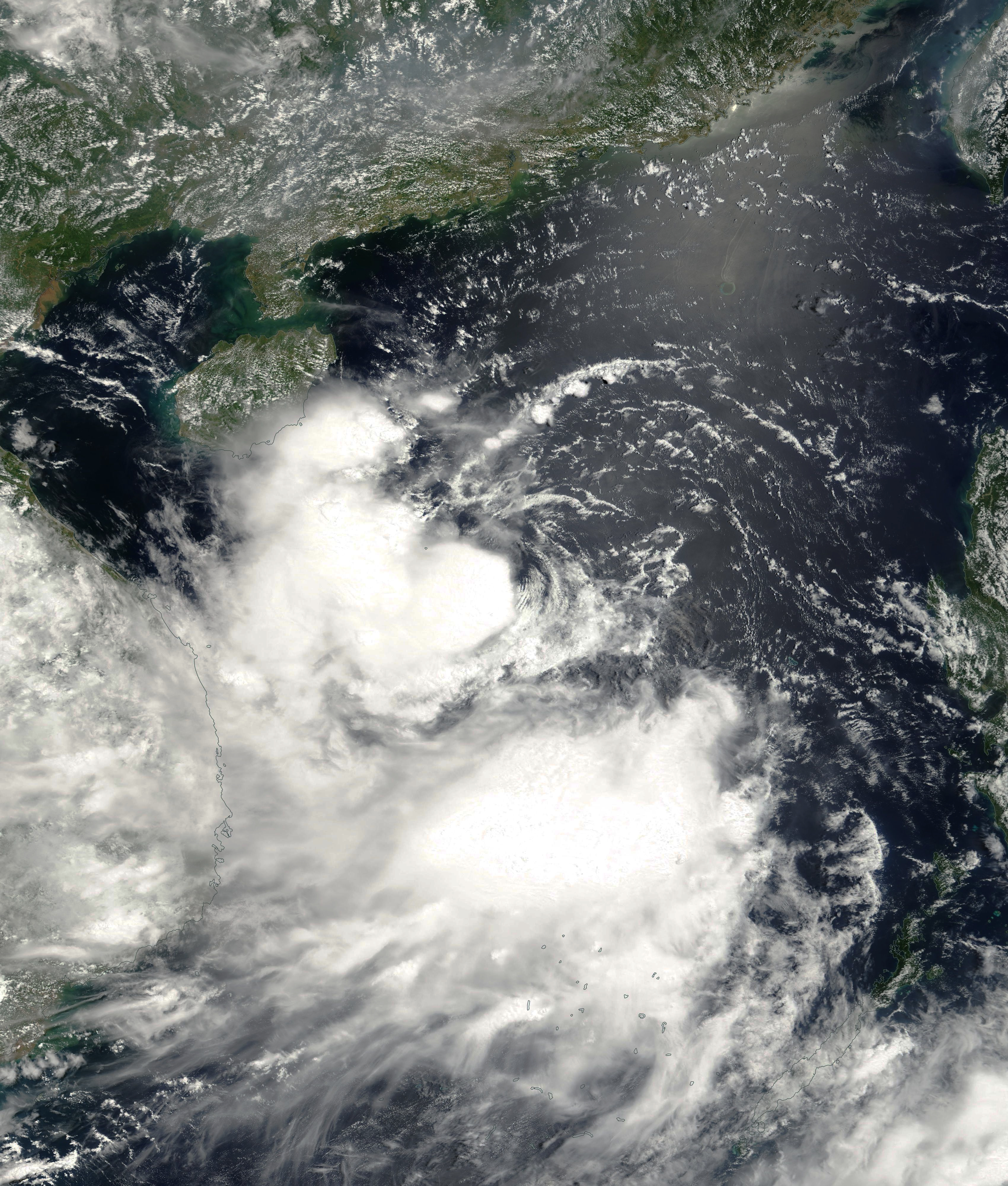
- Tropical Storm Usagi over the South China Sea on August 9

Meteorological history
- Formed: August 8, 2001
- Dissipated: August 11, 2001

Tropical storm
- 10-minute sustained (JMA)
- Highest winds: 65 km/h (40 mph)
- Lowest pressure: 992 hPa (mbar); 29.29 inHg

Tropical storm
- 1-minute sustained (SSHWS/JTWC)
- Highest winds: 75 km/h (45 mph)
- Lowest pressure: 994 hPa (mbar); 29.35 inHg

Overall effects
- Fatalities: 176 total
- Damage: $3.2 million (2001 USD)
- Areas affected: Vietnam, Thailand, Laos
- IBTrACS
- Part of the 2001 Pacific typhoon season

Tropical Storm Usagi was a weak but deadly tropical cyclone that impacted Vietnam and Thailand on early-August 2001. The eighteenth tropical cyclone and the thirteenth named storm of the 2001 Pacific typhoon season, Usagi originated from an area of convection persisted over the South China Sea on August 8. Over low to moderate wind shear, it moved slowly to the west, strengthening to a tropical depression on the same day. Despite favorable conditions, upper-level easterlies inhibited the storm for further intensification while moving westward. However, the JMA, JTWC, and the CMA upgraded the system to a tropical storm, with the former naming it Usagi, shortly before making landfall on Ha Tinh, Vietnam on August 10. It weakened inland and was last noted over Thailand, the next day.

== Meteorological history ==
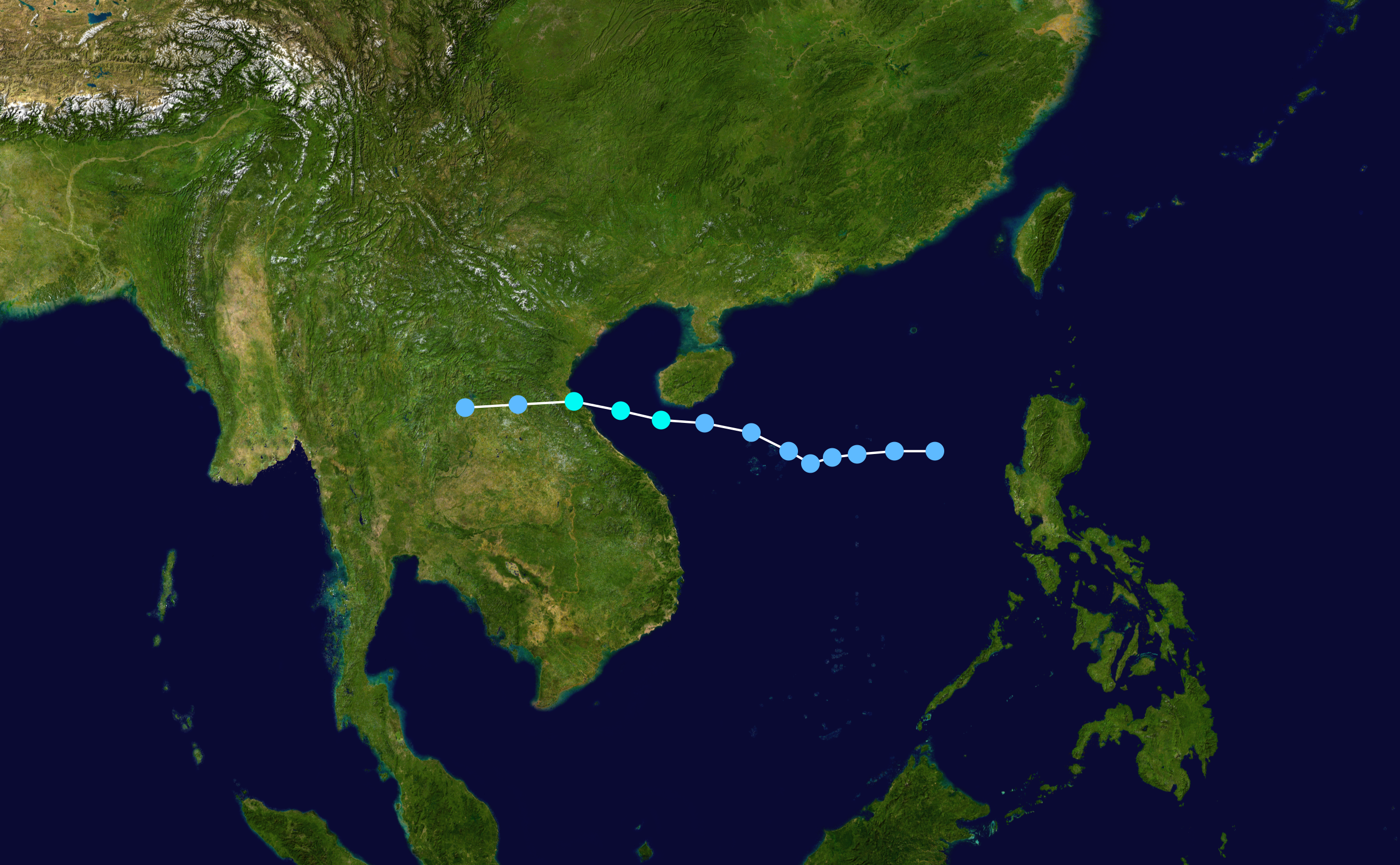
Map plotting the storm's track and intensity, according to the Saffir–Simpson scale Map key Saffir–Simpson scale Tropical depression (≤38 mph, ≤62 km/h) Tropical storm (39–73 mph, 63–118 km/h) Category 1 (74–95 mph, 119–153 km/h) Category 2 (96–110 mph, 154–177 km/h) Category 3 (111–129 mph, 178–208 km/h) Category 4 (130–156 mph, 209–251 km/h) Category 5 (≥157 mph, ≥252 km/h) Unknown Storm type Tropical cyclone Subtropical cyclone Extratropical cyclone, remnant low, tropical disturbance, or monsoon depression

An area of convection developed into a weak tropical depression in the South China Sea, just west off Luzon on August 8. On the next day, operationally, the JTWC began on issuing advisories on the system as Tropical Depression 13W. However, post-analysis showed that the system had already intensified into a tropical depression several hours earlier. Despite with an exposed center, a weak banding feature began to develop around it. Organization of the 13W improved slightly, and by August 10, the system had intensified into a tropical storm, with the JMA naming it Usagi. (Note: The name Usagi (Japanese: ウサギ, [ɯ̟sa̠ɡʲi]) was contributed by Japan and refers to the constellation Lepus, the hare, in Japanese.) Usagi reached its maximum intensity only with 10-minute sustained wind speeds of 65 km/h (40 mph). By 18:00 UTC, Usagi moved inland Vietnam, just to the south of Hanoi, and therefore the JTWC issued its final advisory on the system. The storm continued moving westward over land until it was last noticed by the JMA on August 11.

== Preparations and impact ==
Despite the system making landfall on Vietnam, no damages and fatalities were reported; however, there were reports of flooding throughout the area. The Thai Meteorological Department on the neighbouring country, Thailand reported that over 176 people died due to the flash floods and landslides from the remnants of the storm, with Lom Sak District the worst affected. Flash floods also affected Laos. In total, Usagi killed more than 176 individuals due to the floods across Thailand and nearby Laos and displaced more than 450,000 people.

== See also ==
- Other tropical cyclones named Usagi
- Typhoon Lingling - a violent typhoon that also hit Vietnam, 3 months later.
- Tropical Storm Linfa - also a weak, but deadly tropical storm that impacted the country in October 2020.
