= List of storms named Urmil =

The name Urmil has been used for two tropical cyclones in the South Pacific region of the Southern Hemisphere:

- Cyclone Urmil (2006) – a short-lived tropical cyclone - caused minor damage in Tonga.
- Cyclone Urmil (2026) – a Category 2 tropical cyclone that affected Vanuatu and New Caledonia.
