= List of storms named Ulysses =

The name Ulysses has been used for two tropical cyclones in the Philippine Area of Responsibility by PAGASA in the Western Pacific Ocean. It replaced the name Unding after it was retired following the 2004 Pacific typhoon season. Additionally, it was also used to name a European windstorm in the early 20th century.

- Typhoon Dolphin (2008) (T0822, 27W, Ulysses) – a Category 2-equivalent typhoon, sank a cargo passenger ship, killing at least 47 people
- Typhoon Vamco (2020) (T2022, 25W, Ulysses) – a destructive Category 4-equivalent typhoon, made landfall on Luzon and in Vietnam

The name Ulysses was retired following the 2020 Pacific typhoon season and was replaced with Upang, which means stink bean (Parkia speciosa) in Tagalog.

In Europe:

- Storm Ulysses (1903) – A storm across Ireland and Great Britain, which was named before storms (both tropical and extratropical) were routinely given names. It may have inspired a passage in James Joyce's novel of that name: "Lady Dudley was walking home through the park to see all the trees that were blown down by that cyclone last year and thought she'd buy a view of Dublin."
