= Typhoon Kathy =

Pacific typhoon in 1964

Typhoon Kathy (Welpring)
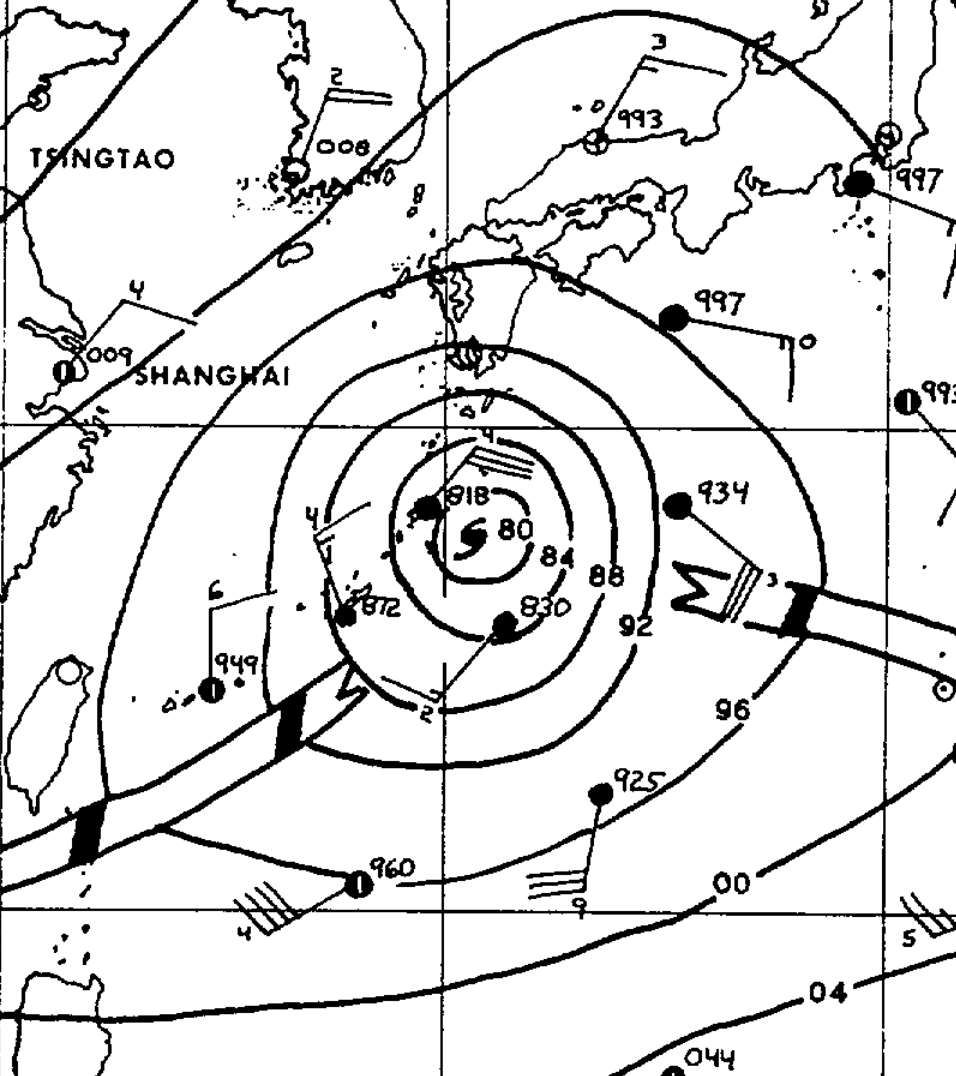
- Typhoon Kathy's surface analysis on August 20, 1964.

Meteorological history
- Formed: August 10, 1964
- Dissipated: August 25, 1964

Violent typhoon
- 10-minute sustained (JMA)
- Highest winds: 215 km/h (130 mph)
- Lowest pressure: 948 hPa (mbar); 27.99 inHg

Category 4-equivalent typhoon
- 1-minute sustained (SSHWS/JTWC)
- Highest winds: 215 km/h (130 mph)
- Lowest pressure: 945 hPa (mbar); 27.91 inHg

Overall effects
- Fatalities: 75
- Damage: Unknown
- Areas affected: Japan, Ryuku Islands
- Part of the 1964 Pacific typhoon season

Typhoon Kathy, known in the Philippines as Super Typhoon Welpring, was the largest and longest-lived typhoon in 1964. As the fourteenth named storm of the season, it originated from an area of circulation southeast of Japan by August 11. The following day, the system strengthened into a tropical storm, gaining the name Kathy. Kathy reached typhoon strength on August 13, passing south of Tokyo, approaching the Ryukyu Islands. The typhoon's winds peaked at 165 km/h (103 mph) on August 14, before tapering as the storm curved west-southwest. For the next four days, Kathy and nearby Typhoon Marie began a Fujiwhara interaction, causing both storms to rotate around each other, which ended when Marie was pulled into Kathy's circulation. Between August 15 and August 16, Kathy weakened into a tropical storm, before strengthening back to typhoon status. The storm's west-southwest path brought the center across the Ryukyu Islands and near Okinawa on August 16 as Kathy began to execute a loop in its track. Two days later, Kathy's winds were estimated by the JTWC to be around 215 km/h (134 mph). The typhoon's track made a smaller loop on August 20, before heading northwards. On August 23, Kathy made landfall in Japan with winds of 130 km/h (81 mph) and weakened to a tropical storm. It then curved northeast. On August 25, Kathy transitioned into an extratropical cyclone and continued northeast, reaching the Bering Strait on September 1. Due to its lifetime and large size, the Joint Typhoon Warning Center issued warnings for 13 1/2 days, and the storm's circulation reached a radius of 1,370 kilometres (850 mi).

== Meteorological history ==
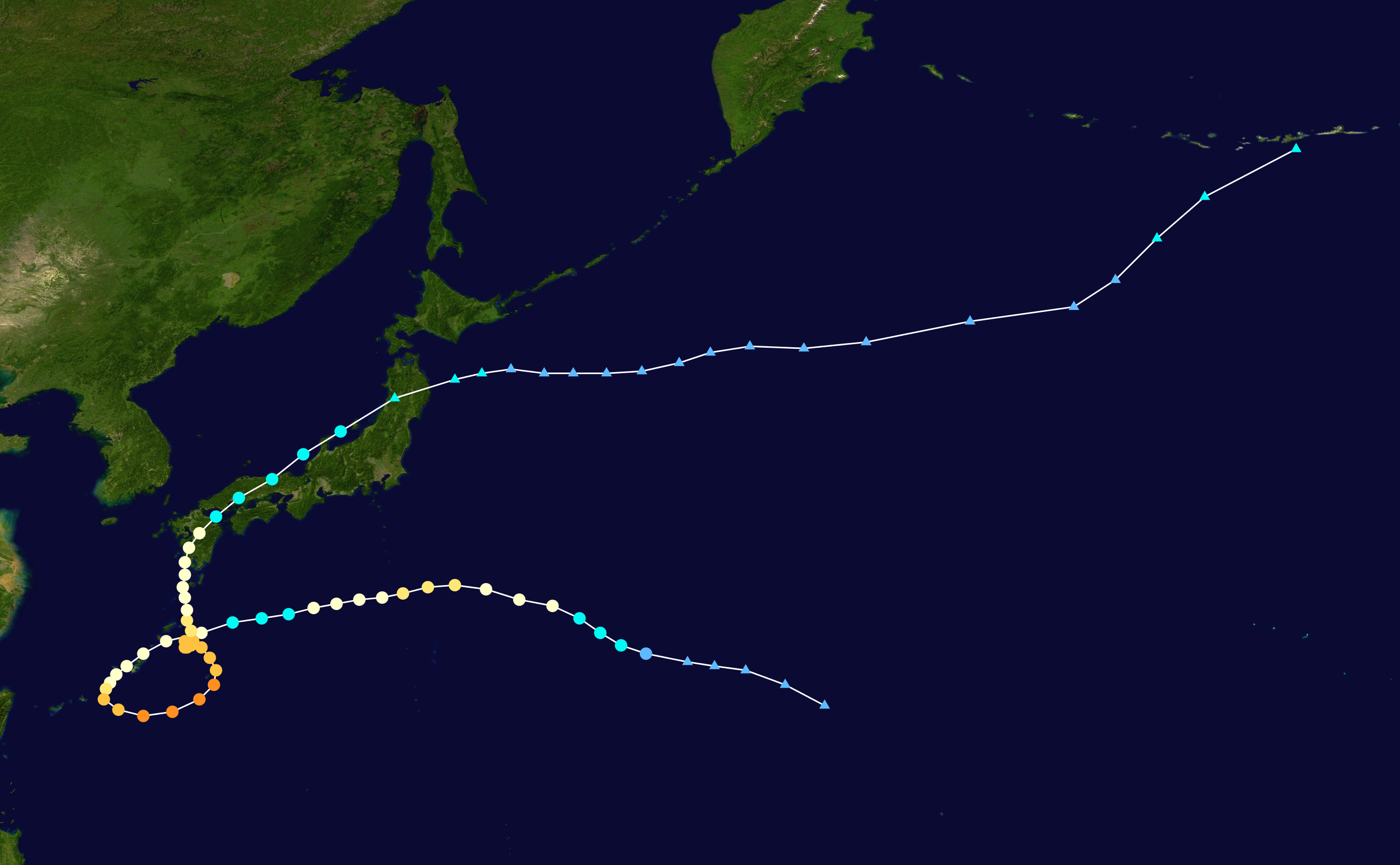
Map plotting the storm's track and intensity, according to the Saffir–Simpson scale Map key Saffir–Simpson scale Tropical depression (≤38 mph, ≤62 km/h) Tropical storm (39–73 mph, 63–118 km/h) Category 1 (74–95 mph, 119–153 km/h) Category 2 (96–110 mph, 154–177 km/h) Category 3 (111–129 mph, 178–208 km/h) Category 4 (130–156 mph, 209–251 km/h) Category 5 (≥157 mph, ≥252 km/h) Unknown Storm type Tropical cyclone Subtropical cyclone Extratropical cyclone, remnant low, tropical disturbance, or monsoon depression

The interaction of a polar trough and easterly wave led to the genesis of an area of circulation southeast of Japan by August 11. This system developed into a tropical storm, gaining the name Kathy the following day east of Iwo Jima based on ship observations. Maintaining a west-northwestward heading, Kathy reached typhoon strength on August 13, passing well south of Tokyo on approach towards the Ryukyu Islands. The typhoon's winds peaked at 165 km/h (103 mph) on August 14 before tapering as the storm curved towards the west-southwest. For the next four days, Kathy and nearby Typhoon Marie began a Fujiwhara interaction, causing both storms to rotate around one another, ending when Marie was absorbed into Kathy's circulation. Between August 15–16, Kathy briefly fell to tropical storm intensity before regaining typhoon status southeast of Amami Ōshima. During this period, an airplane investigating the storm identified multiple wind circulations at the center of Kathy and the storm's clouds were asymmetric. The storm's west-southwest path brought the center across the Ryukyu Islands and near Okinawa on August 16 as Kathy began to execute a counterclockwise loop in its track. Two days later, Kathy's winds were estimated by the JTWC to be around 215 km/h (134 mph) near Minamidaitōjima. The typhoon's track made a smaller counterclockwise loop on August 20 before resuming north across the northern Ryukyu Islands. On August 23, Kathy made landfall on Kagoshima Prefecture with winds of 130 km/h (81 mph) and weakened to a tropical storm as it crossed the Seto Inland Sea and southern Honshu. It then curved to the northeast, briefly entering the Sea of Japan and crossing the Noto Peninsula before traversing northern Honshu and emerging into the northern Pacific. On August 25, Kathy transitioned into an extratropical cyclone and continued northeast towards the Aleutian Islands before it was last in the Bering Strait on September 1.

== Preparations and impact ==
According to the publication Climatological Data, Kathy caused at least 13 deaths and "numerous" injuries, with landslides and flooding being the principal cause of the casualties; as much as 700 mm (28 in) of rain was documented in the mountainous regions of Kyushu, though cities averaged 100 m (3,900 in) in rainfall accumulations. United Press International reported as many as 24 fatalities and 8 missing persons associated with the typhoon, with the Associated Press documenting 28 injuries. Over 4,000 people were rendered homeless. Kathy's effects flooded almost 1,700 homes and destroyed 8 others in Amami Ōshima; winds there reached 138 km/h (86 mph). Sustained winds topped out at 126 km/h (78 mph) with a peak gust of 195 km/h (121 mph) on Yakushima. As Kathy moved across southern and central Kyushu, damage was reported in Kagoshima, Kumamoto, Miyazaki, and Oita prefectures. Kathy's winds razed 44 houses and damaged 80 houses, with another 5,500 flooded by swollen rivers. Flooding broke through river embankments in 37 locations and washed away 18 bridges. Telecommunications and transportation services were disrupted with roads damaged in 400 locations. There were at least 238 landslides caused by the typhoon, including one that derailed a passenger train in Oita Prefecture. One landslide in Kagoshima killed 11 people. Two thousand homes were flooded farther north in Fukushima Prefecture. The extratropical remnants of Kathy brought gale-force winds over the Bering Sea.

== See also ==
- Typhoon Kent (1992) – an intense typhoon that took a comparable track.
- Typhoon Rusa (2002) – the most powerful typhoon to strike South Korea in 43 years and took a nearly identical track.
- Typhoon Halola (2015) – a category 2 equivalent typhoon that affected similar areas.
- Typhoon Noru (2017) – a powerful typhoon that was the second-longest-lasting tropical cyclone of the Northwest Pacific Ocean on record and took a similar track.
- Typhoon Hinnamnor (2022) – a very large and strong tropical cyclone that took nearly identical track.
