= 1971–72 South Pacific cyclone season =

Tropical cyclone season

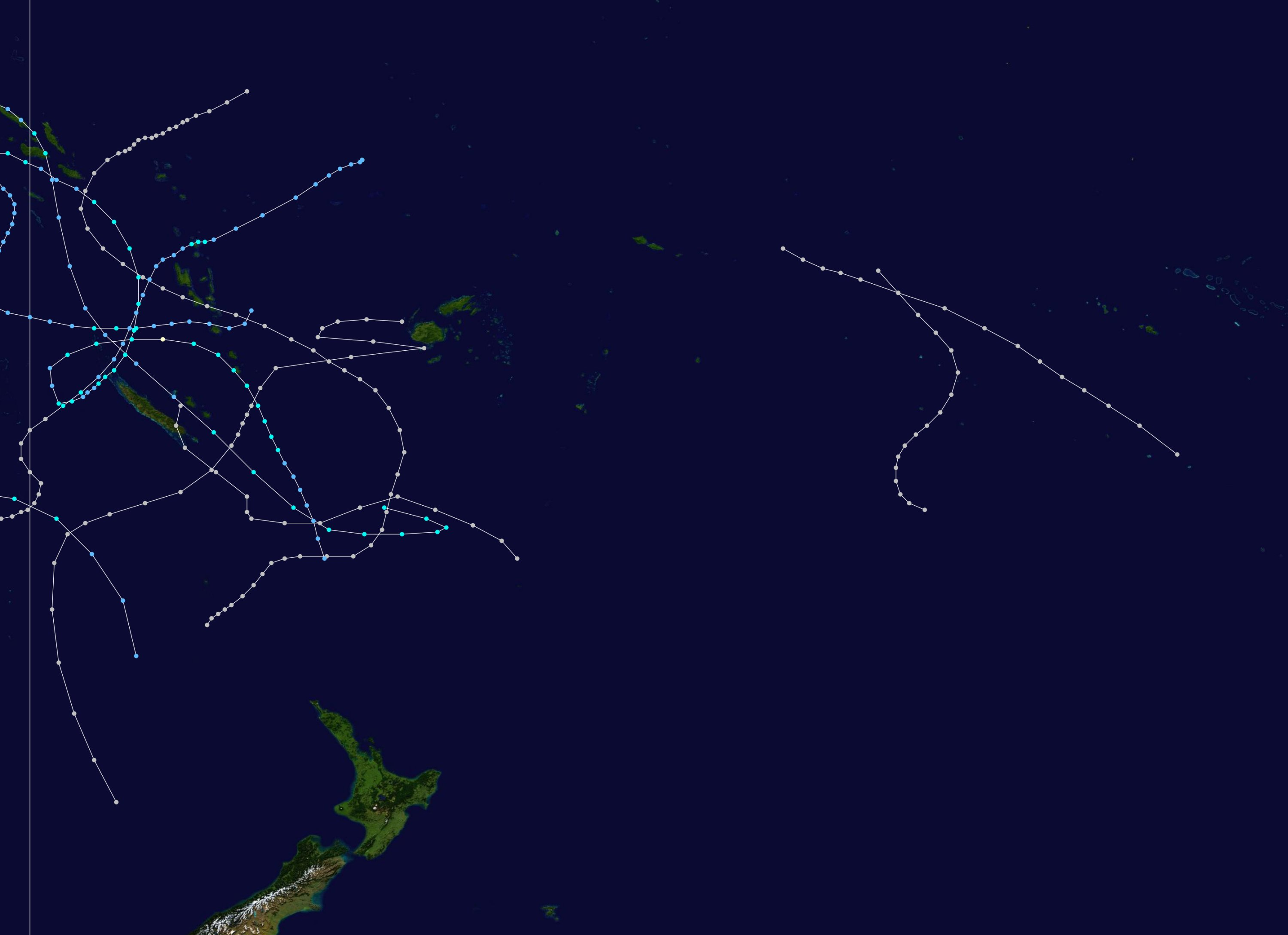
- Season summary map

Seasonal boundaries
- First system formed: November 5, 1971
- Last system dissipated: June 5, 1972

Strongest storm
- Name: Carlotta
  - Maximum winds: 155 km/h (100 mph) (10-minute sustained)
  - Lowest pressure: 940 hPa (mbar)

Seasonal statistics
- Total disturbances: 11
- Tropical cyclones: 11
- Severe tropical cyclones: 6
- Total fatalities: Unknown
- Total damage: Unknown

Related articles
- 1971–72 South-West Indian Ocean cyclone season; 1971–72 Australian region cyclone season

The 1971–72 South Pacific cyclone season, unlike the previous two, was an average season, featuring eleven tropical disturbances, eleven tropical cyclones, and six severe tropical cyclones. The season began only four days after the official start, November 1, and ended very late, on June 5, more than a month after the official end of the season, April 30.

== Systems ==
=== Tropical Cyclone SP7101 ===
- Category 1 tropical cyclone (Australian scale)
- Tropical storm (SSHWS)
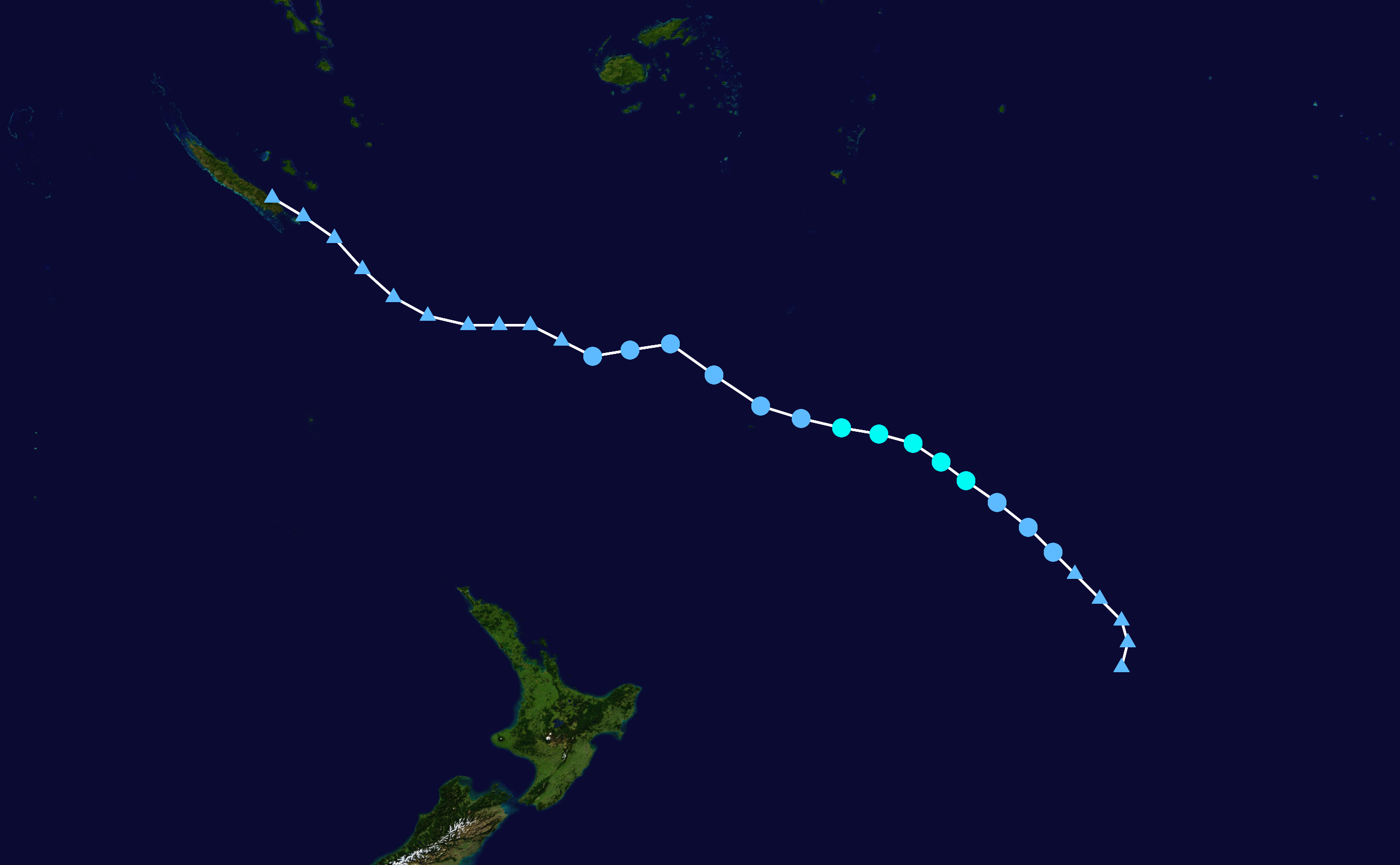
- Duration: November 5 – November 12
- Peak intensity: 85 km/h (50 mph) (10-min); 980 hPa (mbar)

This tropical cyclone existed from November 5–12. However, it didn't have a name.

=== Severe Tropical Cyclone Ursula ===
- Category 3 severe tropical cyclone (Australian scale)
- Category 3 tropical cyclone (SSHWS)
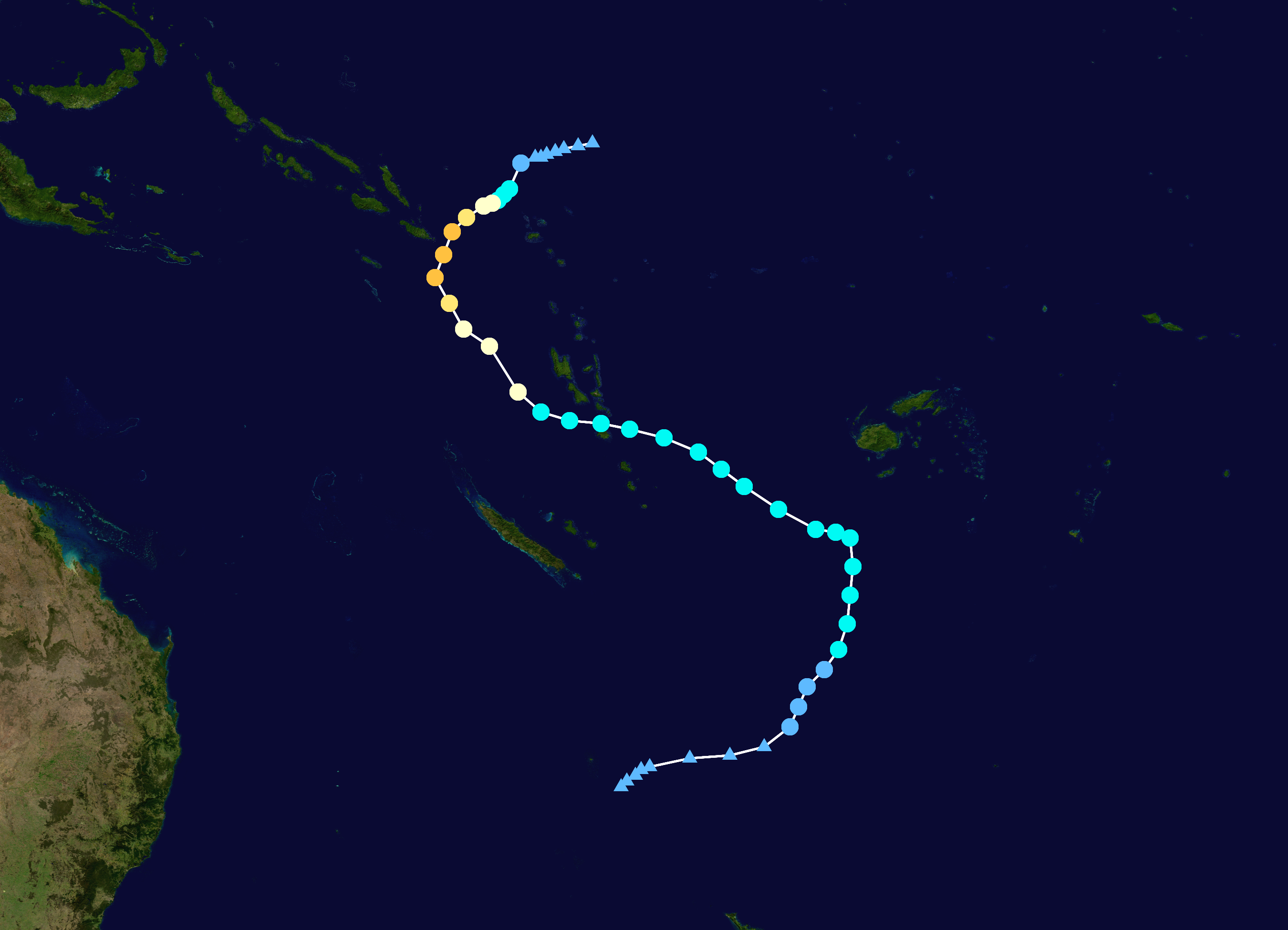
- Duration: December 2 – December 16
- Peak intensity: 130 km/h (80 mph) (10-min); 965 hPa (mbar)

Cyclone Ursula existed from December 2 to 16, 1971 in the Solomon Islands region.

=== Tropical Cyclone Vivienne ===
- Category 1 tropical cyclone (Australian scale)
- Tropical storm (SSHWS)
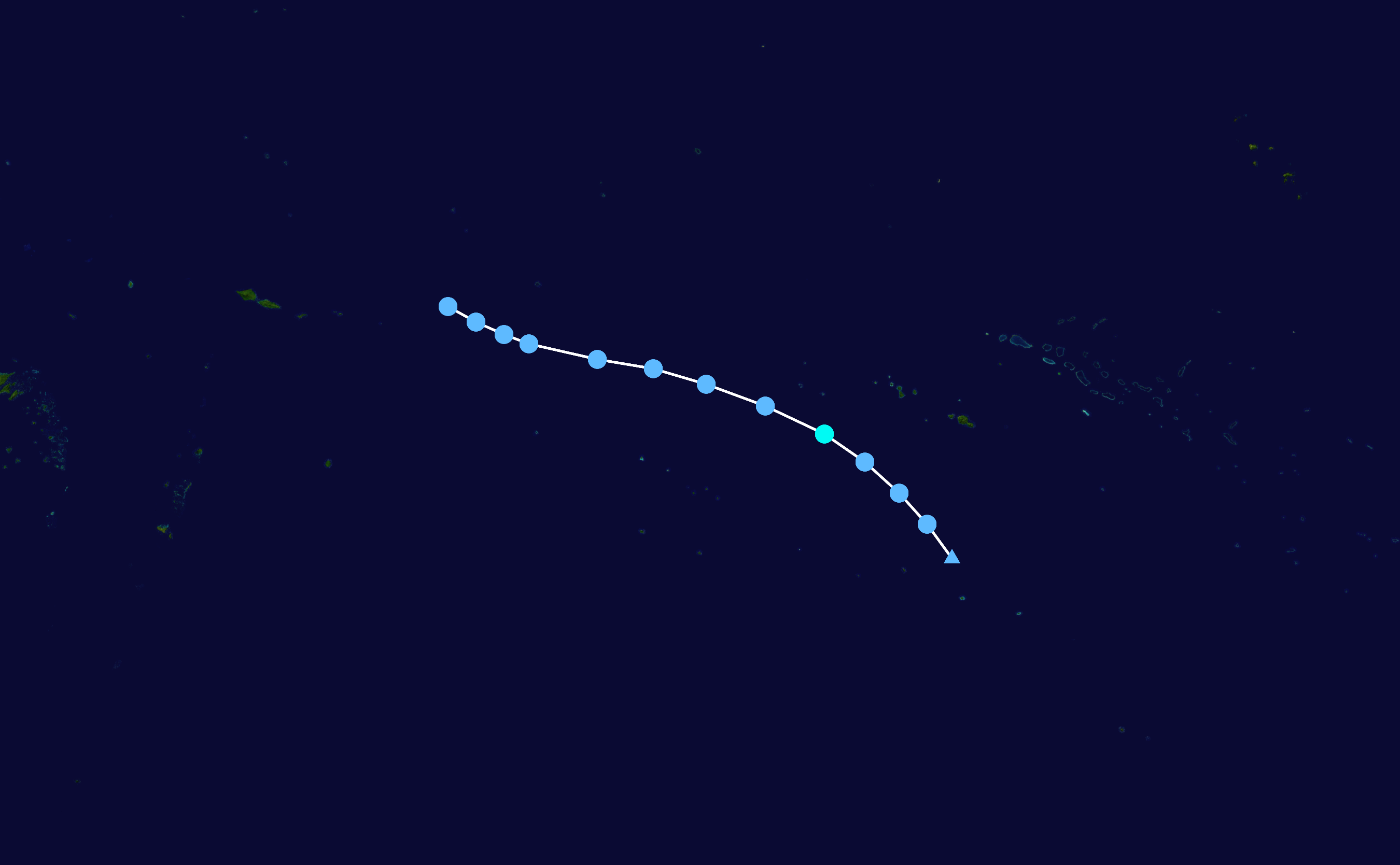
- Duration: December 16 – December 19
- Peak intensity: 65 km/h (40 mph) (10-min); 990 hPa (mbar)

Tropical Cyclone Vivienne existed from December 16–19. It became a Category 1 tropical cyclone ( equivalent to a tropical storm ) on its peak intensity.

=== Tropical Cyclone Althea ===
- Category 1 tropical cyclone (Australian scale)
- Tropical storm (SSHWS)
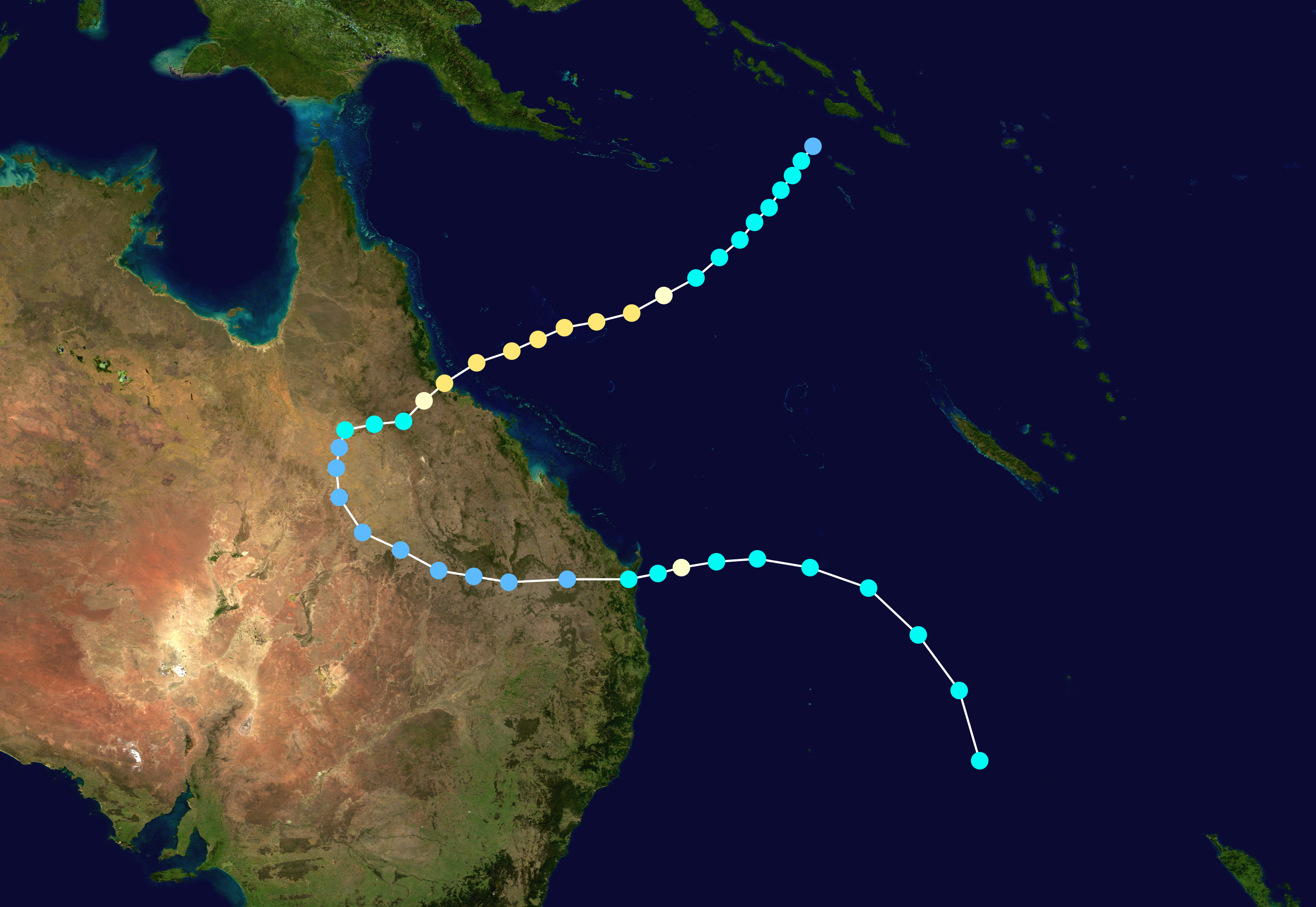
- Duration: December 28 – December 30
- Peak intensity: 85 km/h (55 mph) (10-min); 989 hPa (mbar)

=== Severe Tropical Cyclone Carlotta ===
- Category 3 severe tropical cyclone (Australian scale)
- Category 3 tropical cyclone (SSHWS)
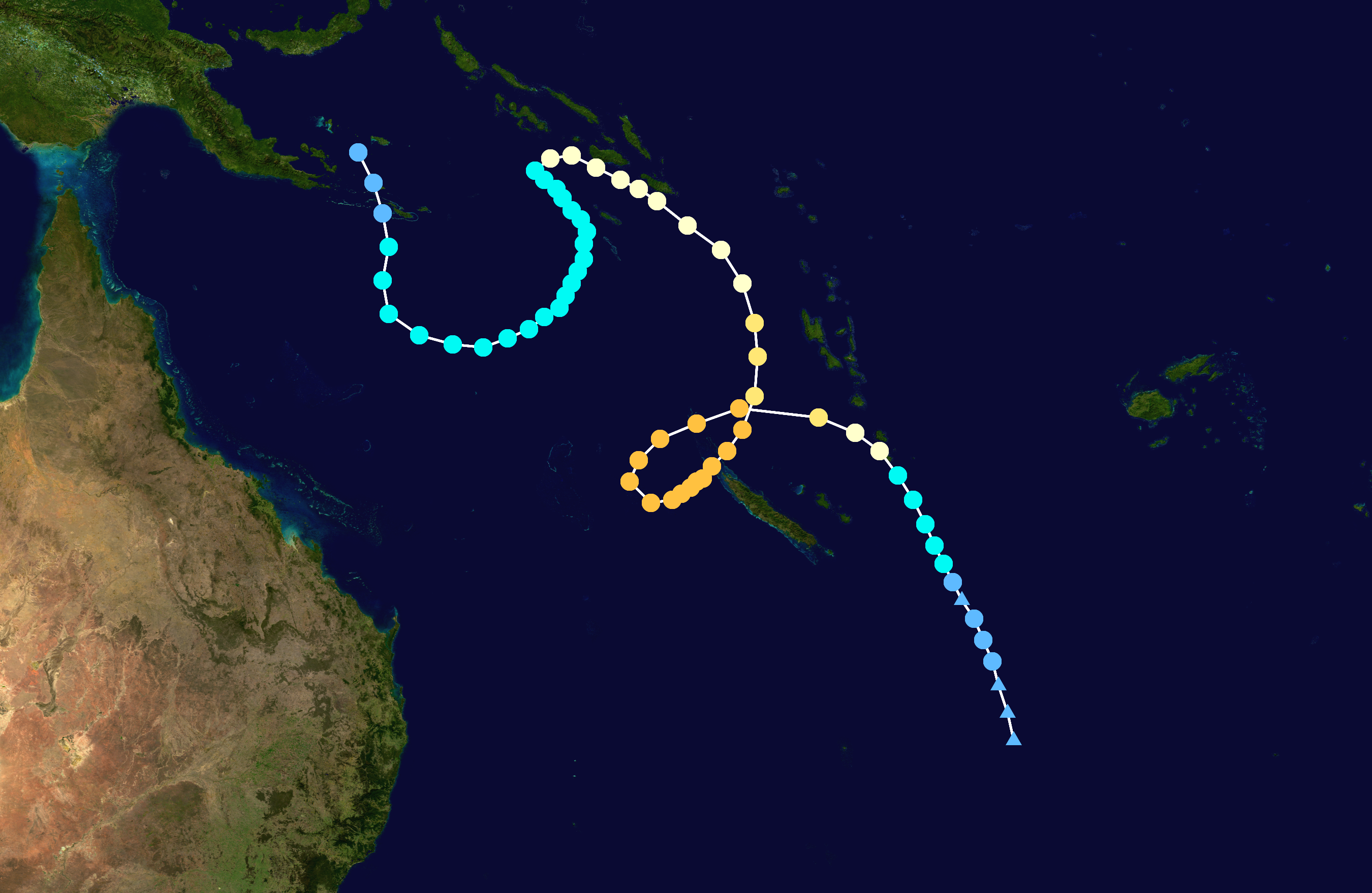
- Duration: January 11 – January 26
- Peak intensity: 155 km/h (100 mph) (10-min); 940 hPa (mbar)

=== Tropical Cyclone SP7102 ===
- Category 1 tropical cyclone (Australian scale)
- Tropical storm (SSHWS)
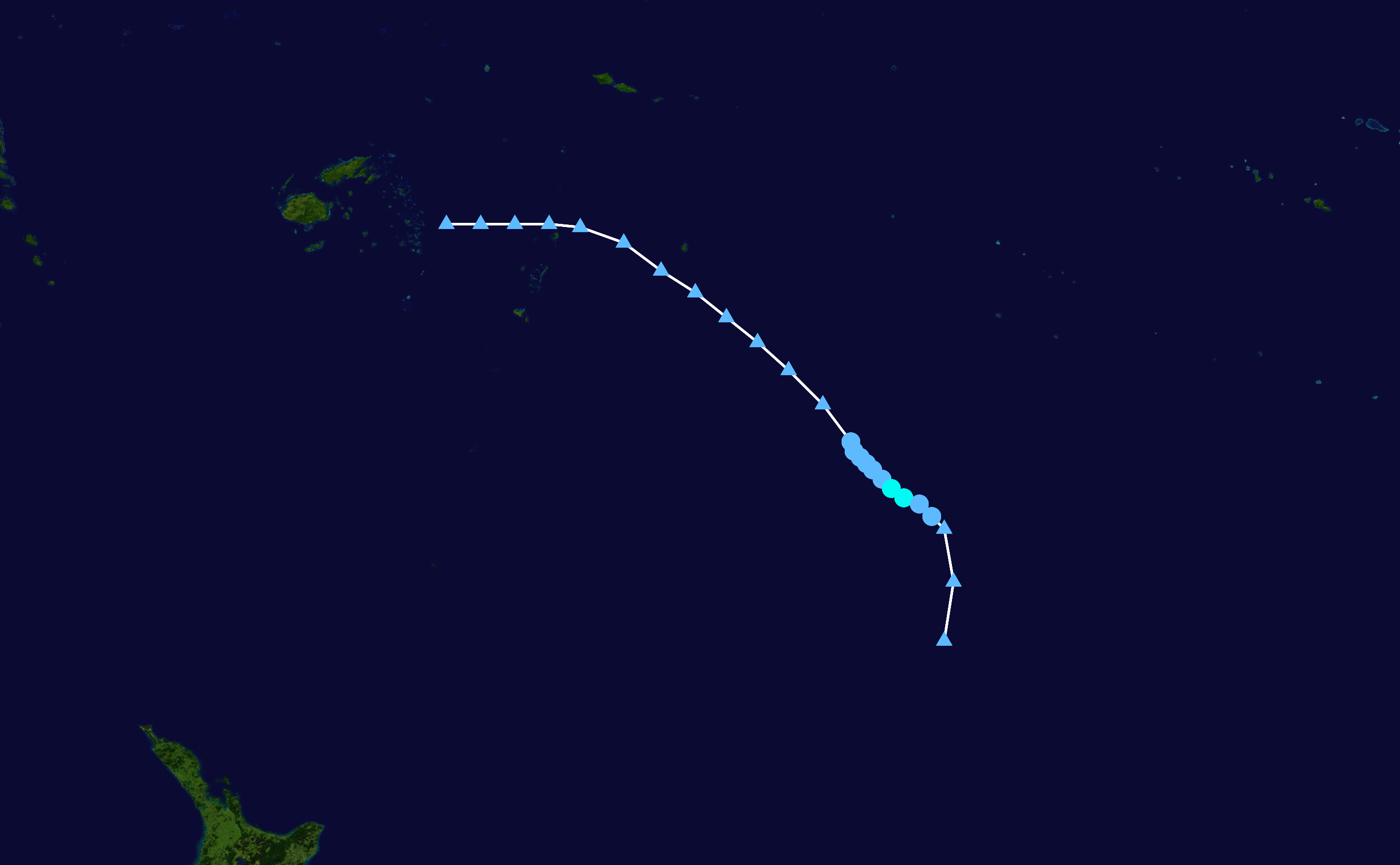
- Duration: January 18 – January 24
- Peak intensity: 65 km/h (40 mph) (10-min); 990 hPa (mbar)

=== Severe Tropical Cyclone Wendy ===
- Category 3 severe tropical cyclone (Australian scale)
- Category 4 tropical cyclone (SSHWS)
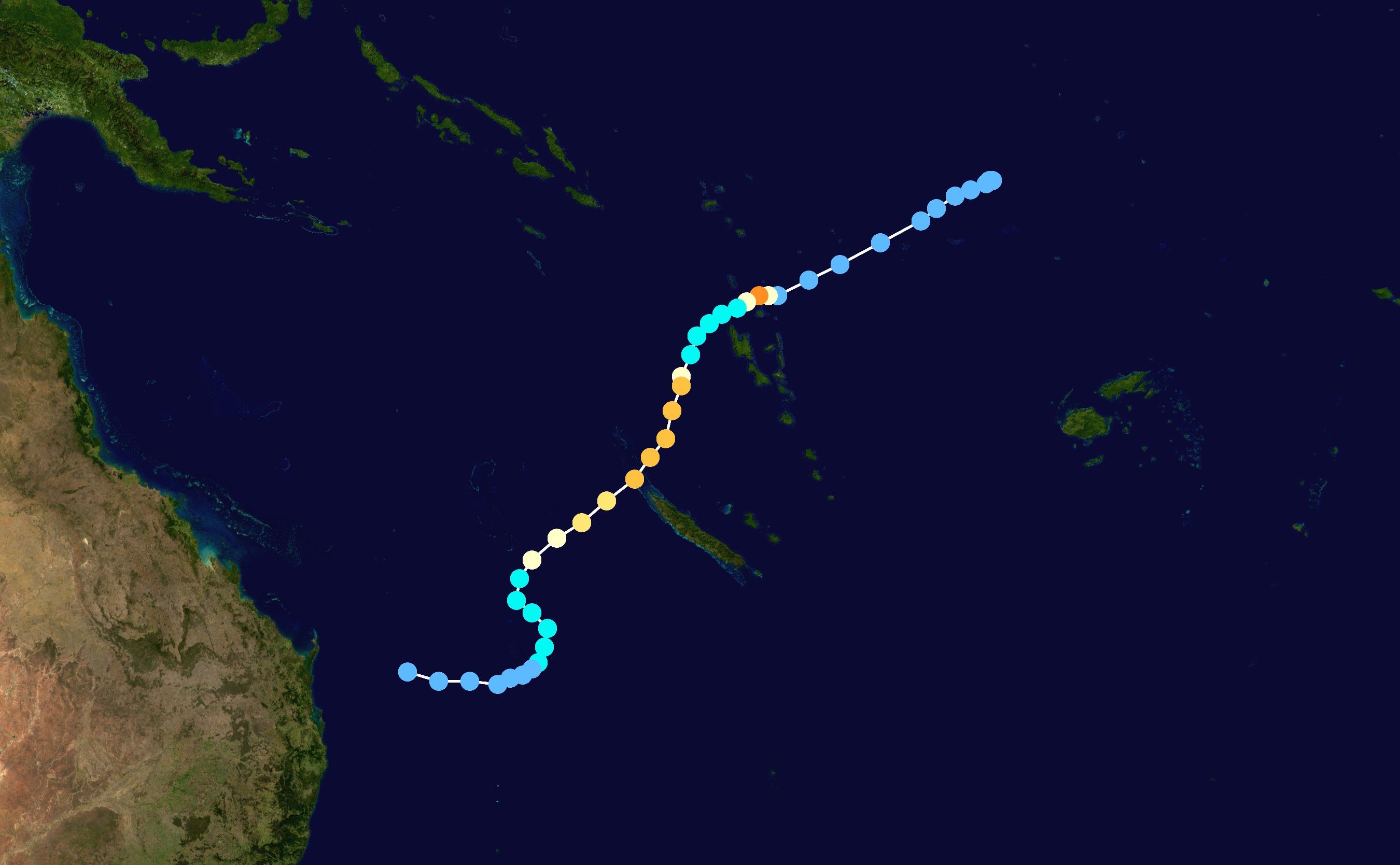
- Duration: January 30 – February 9
- Peak intensity: 155 km/h (100 mph) (10-min); 945 hPa (mbar)

Cyclone Wendy was a Severe Tropical Cyclone that existed from January 30 to February 9, 1972, off the coast of Queensland.

=== Severe Tropical Cyclone Yolande ===
- Category 3 severe tropical cyclone (Australian scale)
- Category 1 tropical cyclone (SSHWS)
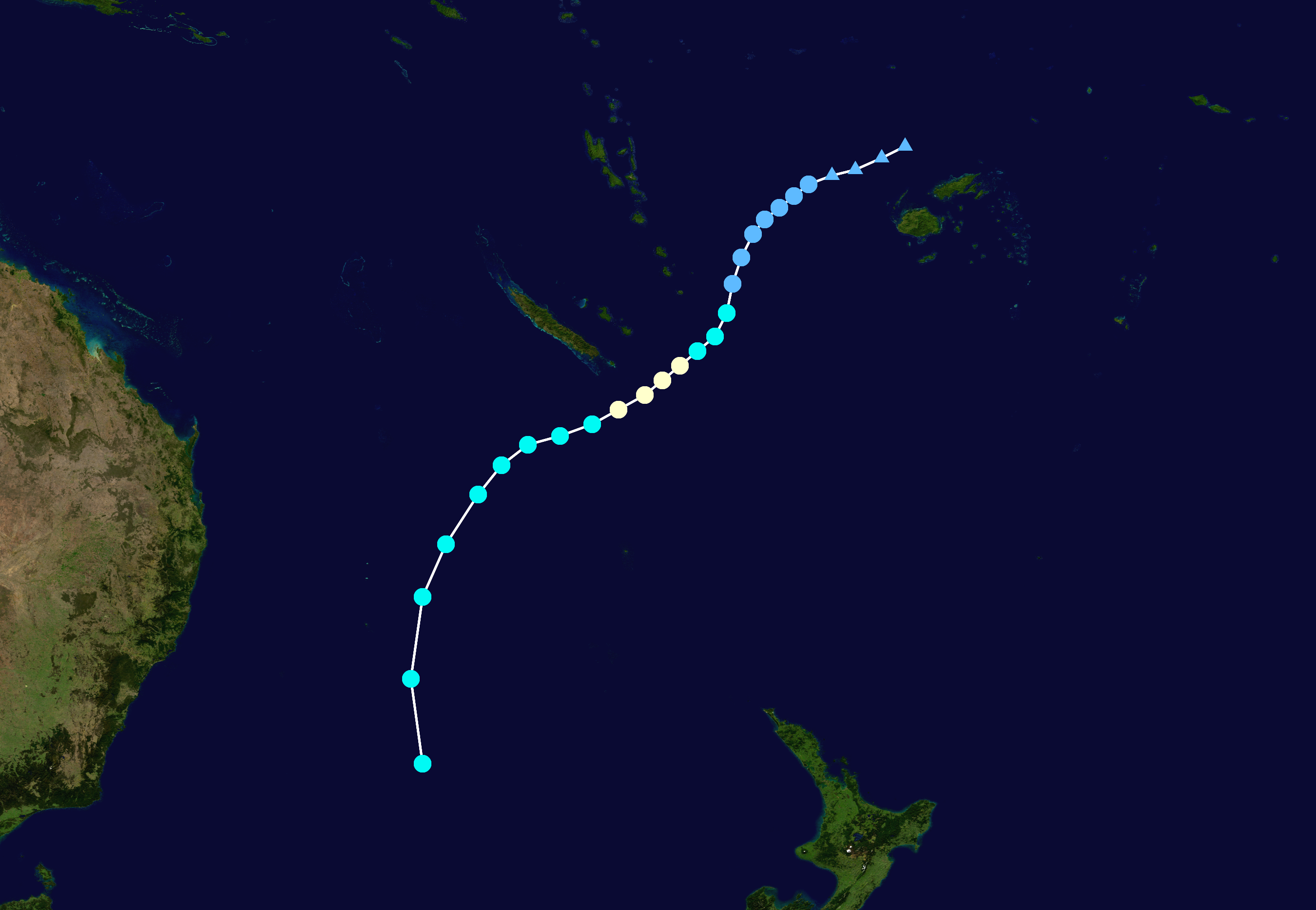
- Duration: March 17 – March 24
- Peak intensity: 120 km/h (75 mph) (10-min); 965 hPa (mbar)

=== Severe Tropical Cyclone Agatha ===
- Category 3 severe tropical cyclone (Australian scale)
- Category 1 tropical cyclone (SSHWS)
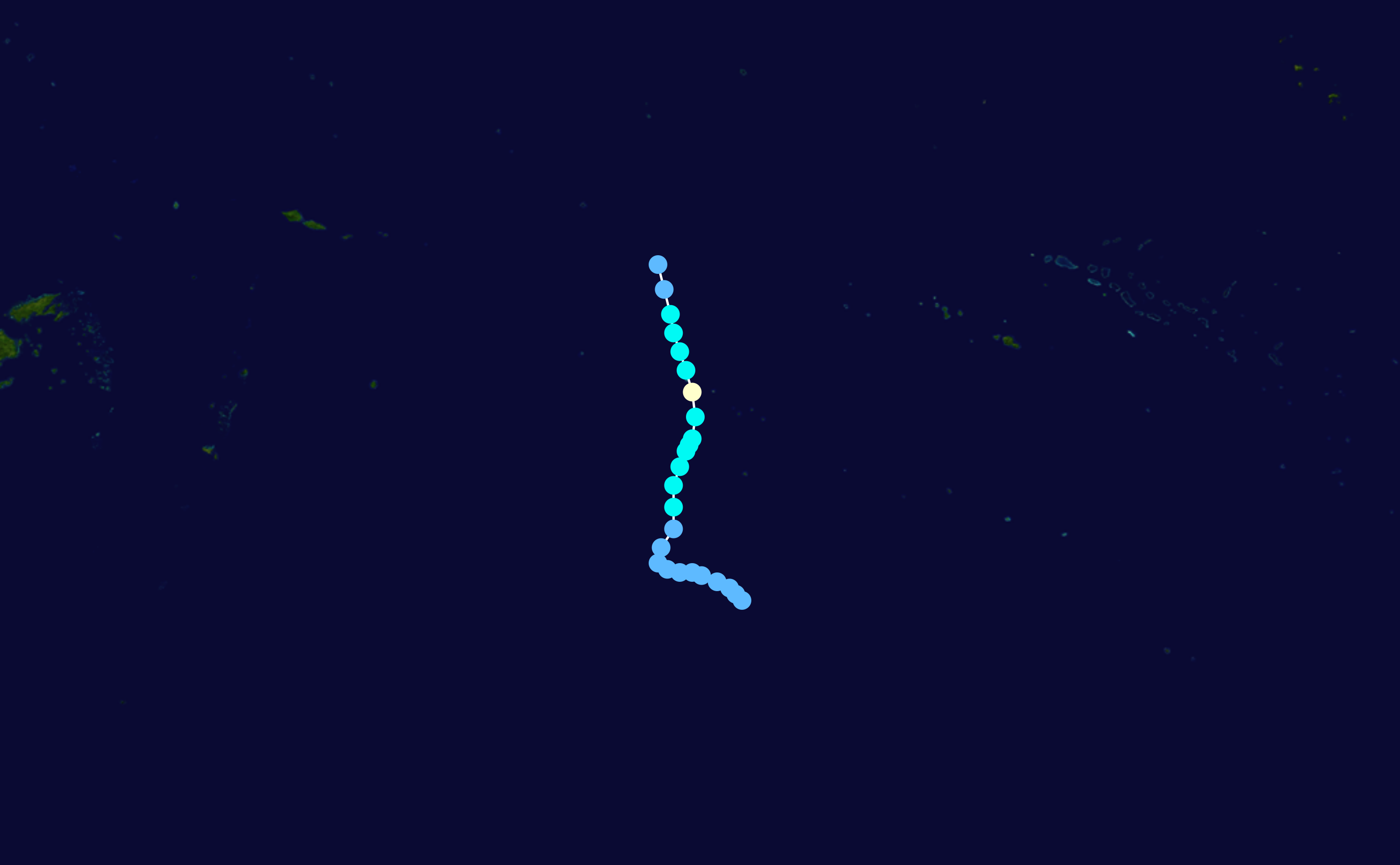
- Duration: March 22 – March 28
- Peak intensity: 120 km/h (75 mph) (10-min); 965 hPa (mbar)

=== Severe Tropical Cyclone Gail ===
- Category 3 severe tropical cyclone (Australian scale)
- Category 3 tropical cyclone (SSHWS)
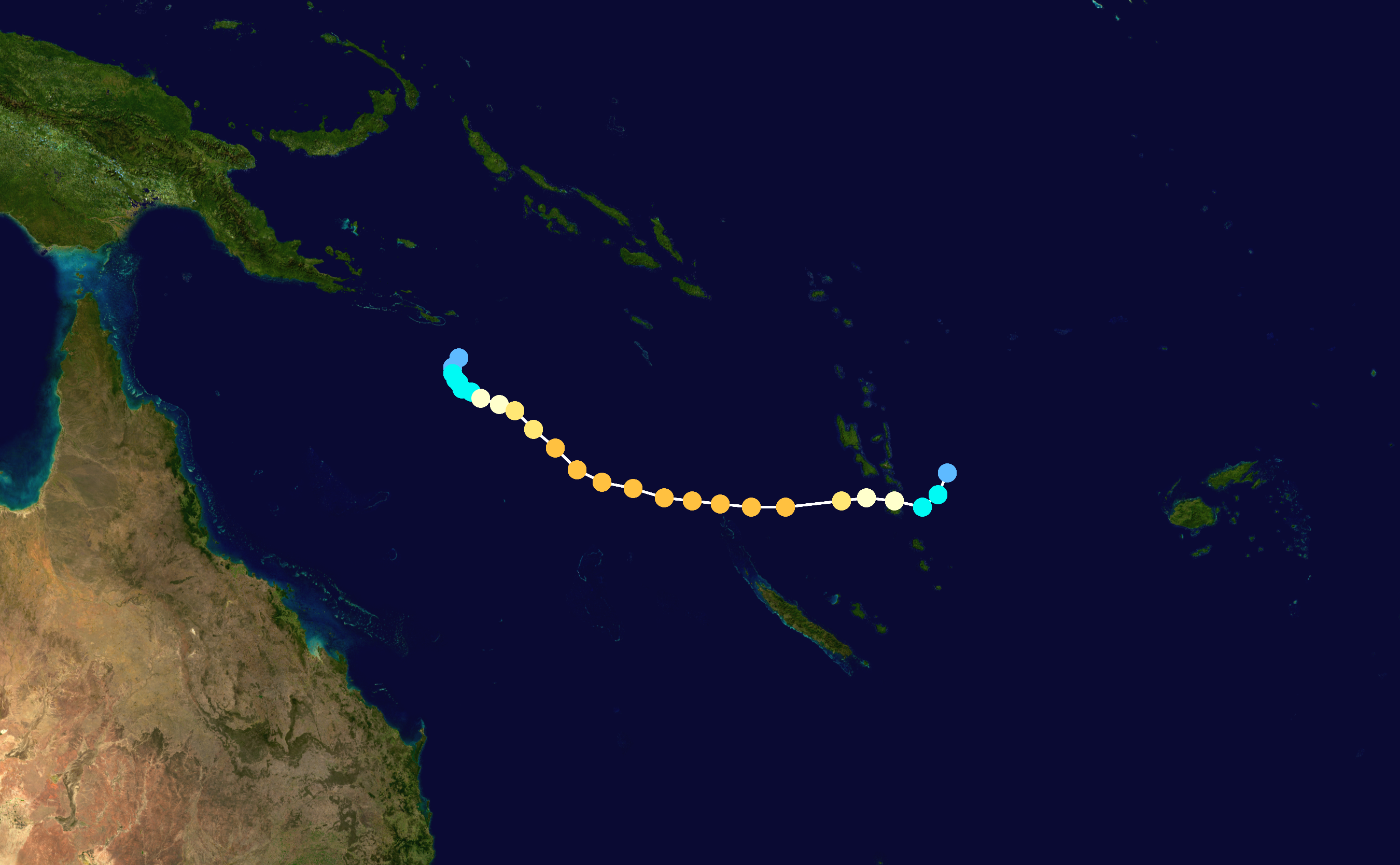
- Duration: April 11 – April 20
- Peak intensity: 140 km/h (85 mph) (10-min); 960 hPa (mbar)

Cyclone Gail existed from April 11 to 20, 1972 well off of the coast of Queensland.

=== Cyclone Ida ===
- Category 3 severe tropical cyclone (Australian scale)
- Category 1 tropical cyclone (SSHWS)
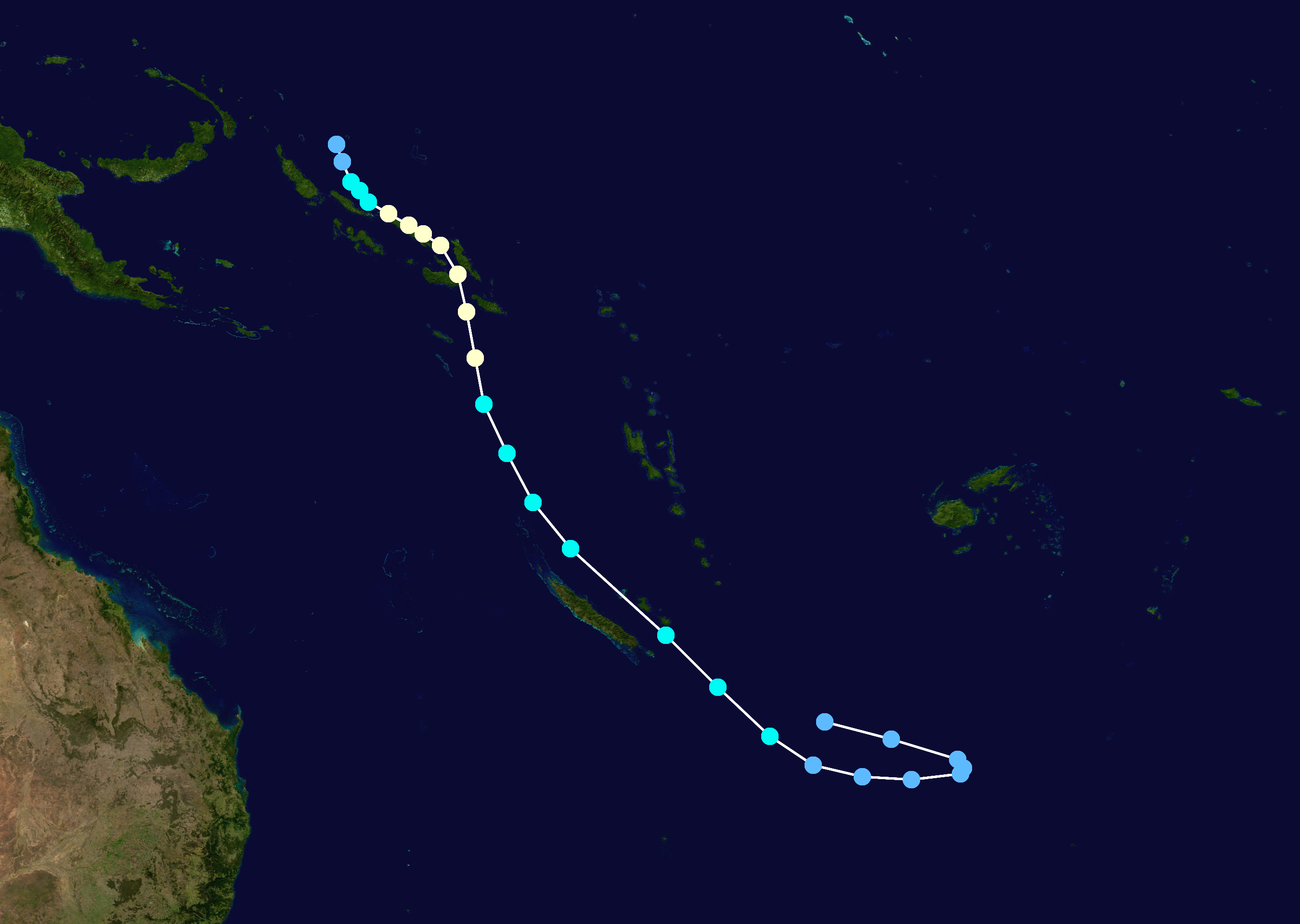
- Duration: May 30 – June 3
- Peak intensity: 120 km/h (75 mph) (10-min); 970 hPa (mbar)

Cyclone Ida existed from May 30 to June 3, 1972, near the Solomon Islands. It caused $70 million in damage.

== See also ==
- Atlantic hurricane seasons: 1971, 1972
- Eastern Pacific hurricane seasons: 1971, 1972
- Western Pacific typhoon seasons: 1971, 1972
- North Indian Ocean cyclone seasons: 1971, 1972
