= List of storms named Usagi =

The name Usagi (Japanese: ウサギ, [ɯ̟sa̠ɡʲi]) has been used for five tropical cyclones in the western North Pacific Ocean. The name was contributed by Japan and refers to the constellation Lepus, the hare (rabbit), in Japanese.

- Tropical Storm Usagi (2001) (T0110, 13W) – a weak storm that struck Vietnam.
- Typhoon Usagi (2007) (T0705, 05W) – a Category 4 typhoon that struck Japan.
- Typhoon Usagi (2013) (T1319, 17W, Odette) – a Category 4 super typhoon that struck the Philippines and China.
- Severe Tropical Storm Usagi (2018) (T1829, 33W, Samuel) – a severe tropical storm that struck the Philippines and Vietnam.
- Typhoon Usagi (2024) (T2425, 27W, Ofel) – a Category 4 super typhoon that struck the Philippines and Taiwan.

The name Usagi was retired following the 2024 Pacific typhoon season and was replaced with Hebi (Japanese: ヘビ, [he̞bʲi]), which refers to the constellation Serpens, the snake, in Japanese.
