= Typhoon Dolphin (2008) =

Pacific typhoon in 2008

Typhoon Dolphin (Ulysses)
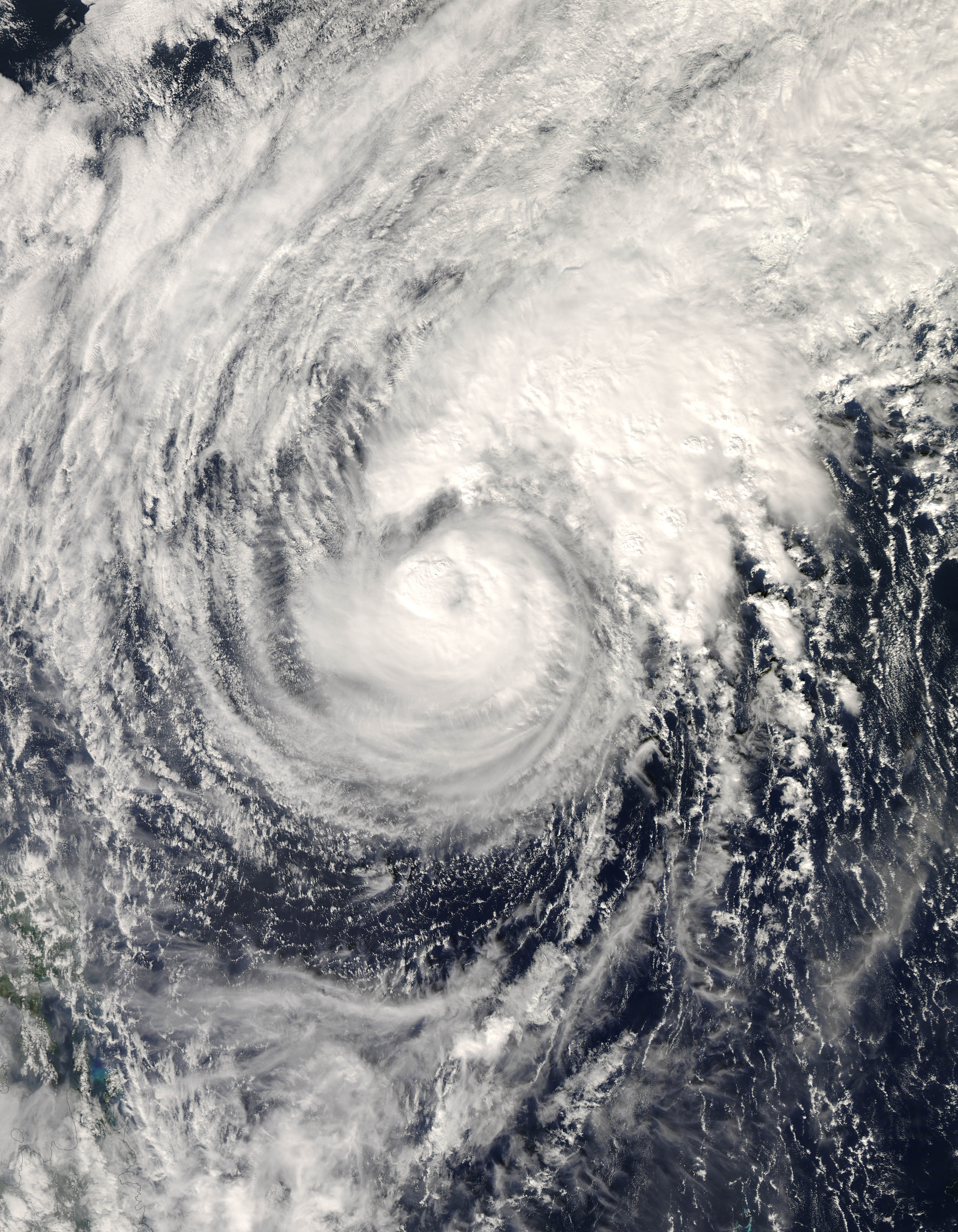
- Typhoon Dolphin at peak intensity on December 16

Meteorological history
- Formed: December 11, 2008
- Extratropical: December 18, 2008
- Dissipated: December 20, 2008

Typhoon
- 10-minute sustained (JMA)
- Highest winds: 120 km/h (75 mph)
- Lowest pressure: 970 hPa (mbar); 28.64 inHg

Category 2-equivalent typhoon
- 1-minute sustained (SSHWS/JTWC)
- Highest winds: 155 km/h (100 mph)
- Lowest pressure: 959 hPa (mbar); 28.32 inHg

Overall effects
- Fatalities: 47 direct
- Missing: 6
- Damage: Unknown
- Areas affected: Papua New Guinea, Hawaii, Wake Island, Marshall Islands, Mariana Islands and Micronesia
- IBTrACS
- Part of the 2008 Pacific typhoon season

Typhoon Dolphin, known in the Philippines as Typhoon Ulysses, was the final named storm and typhoon of the 2008 Pacific typhoon season. The only impact that was reported from Dolphin was to the M/Bca Mae Jan, which was a cargo passenger ship which sank on December 14, due to rough seas caused by Dolphin. There were 46 people reported dead while seven were reported as missing.

Dolphin formed as a tropical depression early on December 8, 2008 to the northwest of Kwajalein Atoll in the Marshall Islands. Over the next few days as the depression moved towards the west, the depression slowly intensified into a tropical storm being named Dolphin by the JMA on December 12. The next day as Dolphin moved into PAGASA's area of responsibility, it was assigned the local name of Ulysses. Dolphin was then upgraded to a typhoon the next day and reached its peak winds of 65 kts (75 mph; 120 km/h 10-minute winds) and 90 kts (105 mph; 165 km/h 1-minute winds) later that day. On December 17, as Dolphin was approaching the edge of PAGASA's Area of responsibility, it was downgraded to a tropical storm by both the JMA and the JTWC. Dolphin was then declared as extratropical the next day as it moved towards the northeast.

== Meteorological history ==
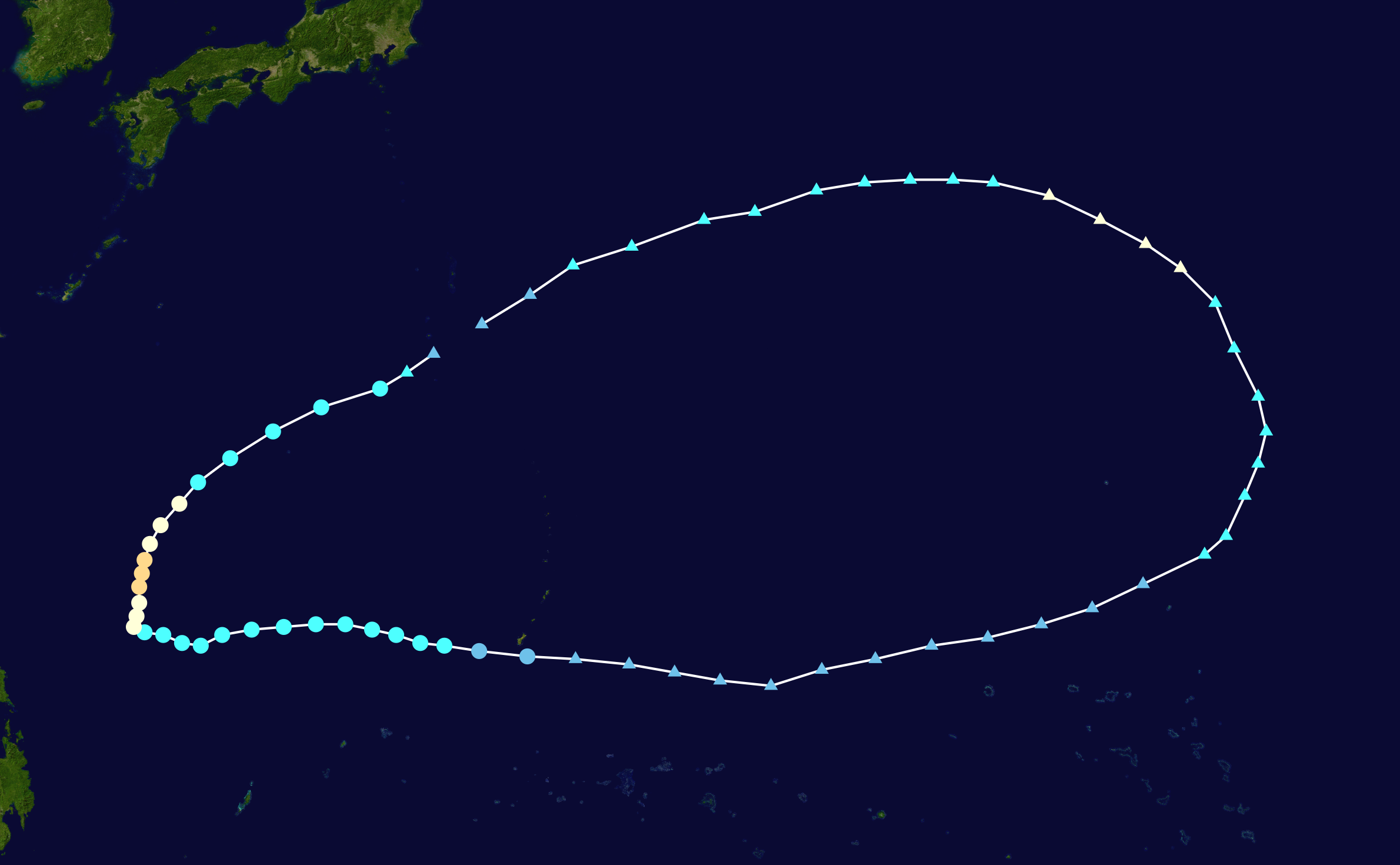
Map plotting the storm's track and intensity, according to the Saffir–Simpson scale Map key Saffir–Simpson scale Tropical depression (≤38 mph, ≤62 km/h) Tropical storm (39–73 mph, 63–118 km/h) Category 1 (74–95 mph, 119–153 km/h) Category 2 (96–110 mph, 154–177 km/h) Category 3 (111–129 mph, 178–208 km/h) Category 4 (130–156 mph, 209–251 km/h) Category 5 (≥157 mph, ≥252 km/h) Unknown Storm type Tropical cyclone Subtropical cyclone Extratropical cyclone, remnant low, tropical disturbance, or monsoon depression

On December 2, the Japan Meteorological Agency (JMA) began to issue gale warnings on a new-born extratropical cyclone around the Ogasawara Islands, and JMA started to issue storm warnings when the system accelerated eastward on the next day. The storm reached storm-force and attained its extratropical peak intensity with 10-minute maximum sustained winds of 60 knots (110 km/h, 70 mph) on December 4, when it was located far east of Japan; however, the low became developed late on the same day.

The storm north of Wake Island started to track east-southeastward on December 5, as well as it tracked southeastward then southward on December 6. At noon, it became a developing low again and reached its extratropical peak intensity for the second time, before it moved into the tropics. On December 7, the storm started to track southwestward and weakened into a gale-force system; eventually, the system transformed into a tropical depression southeast of Wake Island early on December 8.

However, early the next day, the JMA downgraded the depression to a low pressure area, as the depression's low level circulation center was partially exposed, and was in an area of moderate to high vertical wind shear. However the JMA re-upgraded the disturbance to a weak tropical depression 24 hours later. At 0600 UTC that morning, the Joint Typhoon Warning Center (JTWC), released a significant tropical weather advisory and rated the chances of the disturbance becoming a significant tropical cyclone within 24 hours as poor, due to a quikscat pass had shown that the low level circulation center had broken down into a wave. However, after the advisory was released the low level circulation center started to rapidly consolidate, and thus the JTWC initiated issuing warnings at 1200 UTC, December 10, and designated it as Tropical Depression 27W, while it was about 640 km (400 mi) to the east of Guam and moving towards the west. Early the next day the depression's centre passed about 100 km (62 mi) to the south of Guam and made its closest approach.

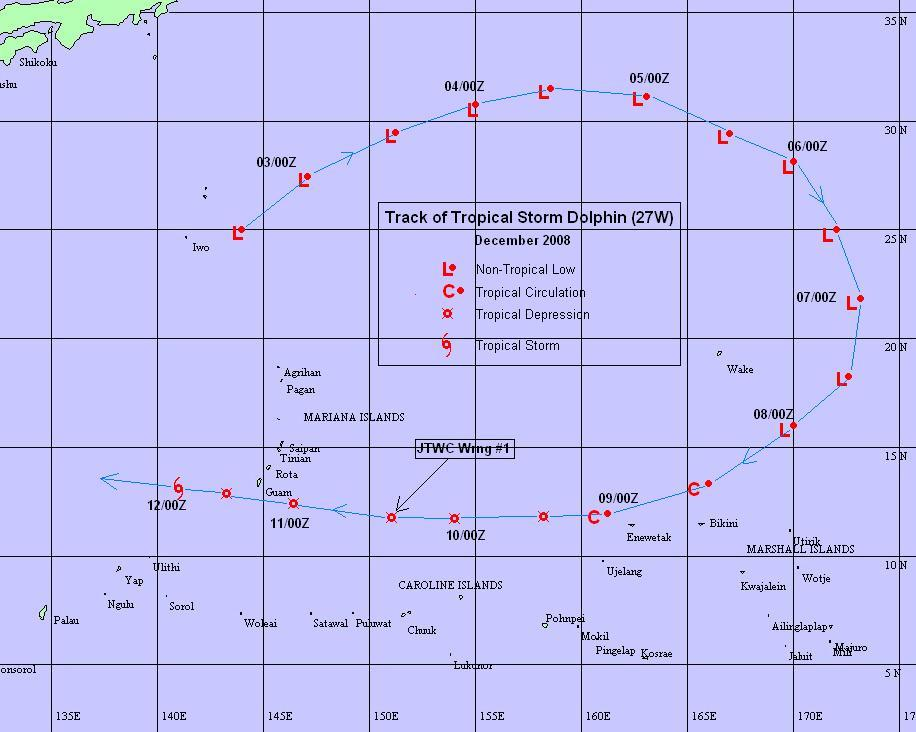
Track map of the precursor to Typhoon Dolphin

The JTWC upgraded the depression to a tropical storm late the next day and then early on December 12 the JMA designated the depression as a full tropical depression. The tropical depression was then upgraded to a tropical storm and named Dolphin later that morning as it moved westwards towards the Philippine Atmospheric, Geophysical and Astronomical Services Administration (PAGASA) area of responsibility. (Note: The name Dolphin was contributed by Hong Kong and refers to the Chinese white dolphin (Sousa chinensis), a mascot in Hong Kong.) The next day as Tropical Storm Dolphin moved into PAGASA's area of responsibility, PAGASA assigned the local name of Ulysses to Dolphin. The JMA upgraded Tropical Storm Dolphin to a Severe Tropical Storm late on December 14. Whilst Dolphin was upgraded to a Typhoon by the JTWC early the next day as Dolphin recurved towards the North. Later that day the JTWC reported that Typhoon Dolphin had reached its peak winds of 90 kts (105 mph; 165 km/h 1-minute winds) which made Typhoon Dolphin a category two Typhoon on the Saffir–Simpson hurricane scale. At the same time the JMA reported that Severe Tropical Storm Dolphin had intensified into a Typhoon and had also reached its peak wind speeds of 65 kts (75 mph; 120 km/h 10-minute winds).

Early in the afternoon of December 16, the JMA downgraded Typhoon Dolphin from a Typhoon to a Severe Tropical Storm, as it moved towards the northwest. This came as the JTWC reported that Dolphin had weakened into a Category One Typhoon. Early the next day the JTWC downgraded Typhoon Dolphin to a Tropical Storm, whilst later that day the JMA also downgraded Dolphin to a Tropical Storm. This came as Tropical Storm Dolphin moved out of PAGASA's Area of responsibility. Early in the afternoon of December 18, both the JMA and the JTWC released their final advisories on Tropical Storm Dolphin as they downgraded Dolphin to an extratropical low. The extratropical low dissipated two days later.

== Preparations, impact and aftermath ==
=== Micronesia ===
From December 8 to December 12, large sea swells up to 3 m (9.8 ft), generated by the extratropical cyclone that was to become Typhoon Dolphin and Tropical Disturbance 03F, affected many islands throughout Micronesia including Papua New Guinea and Hawaii. The most affected areas included New Ireland, Bougainville, Manus, East Sepik, Morobe, and West Sepik. The waves affected over 50,000 to 80,000 people with over 400 people left homeless after their homes were destroyed.

=== Guam and Rota ===
Late on December 10, as the JTWC reported that Tropical Depression 27W had formed, the National Weather Service forecast office in Guam issued a tropical storm warning for Guam as tropical storm conditions were anticipated to impact the island within 24 hours. A tropical storm watch was also declared for Rota at this time as tropical storm-force winds were possibly going to affect Rota within 24 hours. Early the next day the tropical storm watch for Rota was cancelled followed by the tropical storm warning for Guam later that day as the depression was accelerating away from the Islands. The Guam Emergency Operations Center was partially activated and Guam Homeland Security and Office of Civil Defense personnel were on call in case they were needed. Residents were advised to bring in all holiday decorations that may become airborne and prepare their emergency disaster kits. Within Guam, flights in and out of Guam International Airport were not cancelled as winds did not exceed 90 km/h, (55 mph). The maximum reported rainfall amount was at Inarajan Handar which reported 2.05 inches of rainfall in the 48 hours starting on December 10 at 0100 UTC. Guam government officials reported that there was not much significant damage, with power outages around the island being sporadic which were primarily caused by falling trees and debris. There was also some minor flooding and beach erosion caused by storm tides.

=== M/Bca Mae Jan ===
The M/Bca Mae Jan was a cargo passenger ship which sank on December 14 due to rough seas caused by Typhoon Dolphin. The M/Bca Mae Jan was only licensed to carry 40 passengers and 10 members of crew; however, at the time of its sinking the M/Bca Mae Jan was carrying 97 people. Of the 98 people, 47 died and 7 were missing. Vessels operating in the area were asked to help in the search and rescue operation, whilst the Philippine coastguard directed three ships to perform aerial and surface searches.

The Philippine National Disaster Coordinating Council reported on December 17 that the local Government unit of Ballesteros, Cagayan had provided assistance worth 16,500 PHP ($352 2008 USD). Whilst the Department of Health-Center for Health Development had provided 27,203 PHP ($582 2008 USD) worth of assistance, in the form of drugs, fluids and medicines for the injured victims that were confined at the Ballesteros District Hospital. The Department of Social Welfare and Development provided cash and relief goods totalling up to 128,000 PHP ($2,740 2008 USD), The Department of Social Welfare and Development also propositioned standby funds of 255,000 PHP ($5,453 2008 USD).

== See also ==
- Other tropical cyclones named Dolphin
- Other tropical cyclones named Ulysses
- Timeline of the 2008 Pacific typhoon season
- Typhoon Parma (2003) - Also looped around the same region
