= Typhoon Kim (1977) =

Pacific typhoon in 1977

Typhoon Kim (Unding)
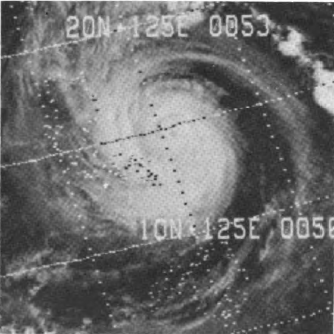
- Typhoon Kim on November 13, approaching Luzon

Meteorological history
- Formed: November 6, 1977
- Dissipated: November 17, 1977

Violent typhoon
- 10-minute sustained (JMA)
- Highest winds: 205 km/h (125 mph)
- Lowest pressure: 920 hPa (mbar); 27.17 inHg

Category 4-equivalent typhoon
- 1-minute sustained (SSHWS/JTWC)
- Highest winds: 230 km/h (145 mph)
- Lowest pressure: 916 hPa (mbar); 27.05 inHg

Overall effects
- Fatalities: 102
- Injuries: 115
- Missing: Unknown
- Damage: >$2.04 million (1977 USD)
- Areas affected: Philippines, Guam
- Part of the 1977 Pacific typhoon season

Typhoon Kim, known in the Philippines as Typhoon Unding, was a powerful typhoon that struck the Philippines and Guam in November 1977, causing over 100 fatalities and widespread damage. It was the fiftieth depression, eighteenth tropical storm, ninth typhoon, and third violent typhoon of the 1977 Pacific typhoon season.

The storm began as an area of low pressure, which originated from a near-equatorial surface trough. The trough consolidated on November 2, becoming a disturbance which strengthened to be named Kim. The storm slowly intensified due to the subtropical ridge, which later weakened and allowed Kim to strengthen quicker. It made landfall in Guam as a tropical storm on November 8, then quickly became a strong typhoon. It reached a peak of 145 mph on November 10. Kim would make landfall in Luzon, Philippines on November 13 as a Category 4-equivalent typhoon. After landfall, it rapidly deteriorated and turned to the northeast. It dissipated on November 17 southeast of the Ryukyu Islands.

Kim claimed the lives of 102 people as it passed over Luzon as a strong typhoon, mostly due to flooding. A similar number of people were injured. A little over $2 million USD in damages were reported from Kim.

== Meteorological history ==
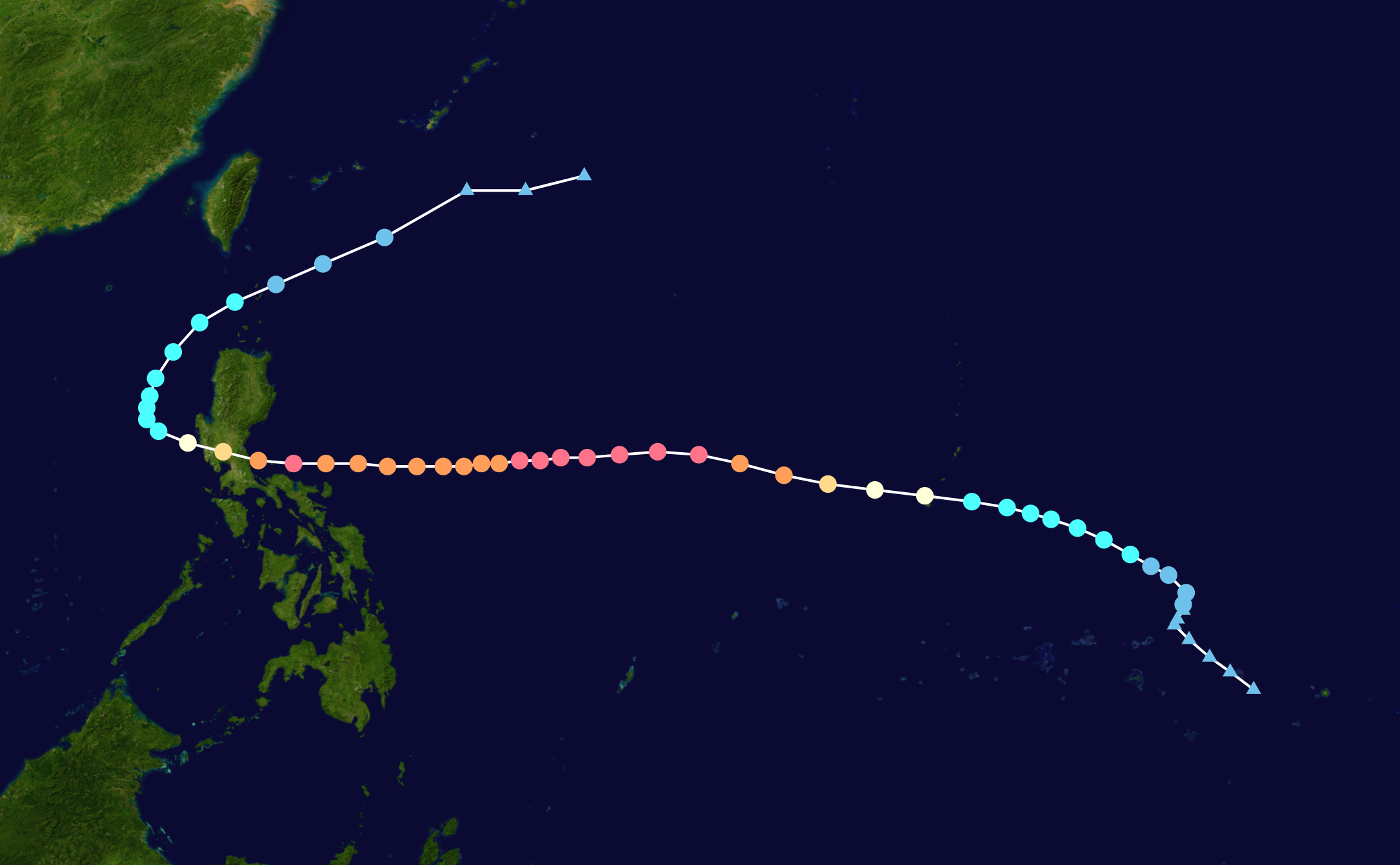
Map plotting the storm's track and intensity, according to the Saffir–Simpson scale Map key Saffir–Simpson scale Tropical depression (≤38 mph, ≤62 km/h) Tropical storm (39–73 mph, 63–118 km/h) Category 1 (74–95 mph, 119–153 km/h) Category 2 (96–110 mph, 154–177 km/h) Category 3 (111–129 mph, 178–208 km/h) Category 4 (130–156 mph, 209–251 km/h) Category 5 (≥157 mph, ≥252 km/h) Unknown Storm type Tropical cyclone Subtropical cyclone Extratropical cyclone, remnant low, tropical disturbance, or monsoon depression

Typhoon Kim originated from an active near-equatorial trough, which extended through the western Marshall Islands. On November 2, it had consolidated into a single surface circulation, with a pressure of 1,007 hPa (29.7 inHg). On November 3 at 2155Z, satellite data found the disturbance that eventually became Kim, with winds initially at about 35 km/h (22 mph). A formation alert was issued on November 4 due to satellite and synoptic data indicating a strengthening surface circulation. The next day, aircraft reconnaissance found a barometric pressure of 1,007 hPa (29.7 inHg), with winds of 37 km/h (23 mph). A second aircraft reconnaissance mission on November 6 found a pressure of 1,004 hPa (29.6 inHg), with winds of about 45 km/h (28 mph), with led to the first warning of Kim as Tropical Depression 19 at 0600Z the same day, which upgraded to Tropical Storm Kim 12 hours later. Kim turned toward Guam at a speed of approximately 20 km/h (12 mph). Slow intensification occurred during the next 48 hours due to a strong subtropical ridge to the north, combined with a shortwave trough in the upper tropospheric westerlies. However, outflow aloft strengthened after the trough passed by, combined with the subtropical ridge weakening, signaling increased organization. In a 24-hour period starting on November 8, Kim intensified at a rate of 55 km/h (34 mph), with the central pressure dropping 22 mbar (0.65 inHg).

Between 1020Z and 1235Z, Kim made landfall in Guam from the east-southeast, with winds of about 110 km/h (68 mph). It exited the island to the west-northwest. The eye passage over Guam lasted 1 hour and 10 minutes. After Kim exited Guam, Kim upgraded to typhoon status at 22:00 local time the same day, with intensification continuing for the next 48 hours. The subtropical ridge continued to slowly weaken more during this period but was decently strong enough to turn Kim west-northwestward. As the tropospheric steering flow weakened, intensification increased, with Kim ultimately reaching its peak intensity of about 235 km/h (146 mph) from the JTWC on November 10, winds similar to that of a Category 4 hurricane. After the peak intensity period, Kim took a more westward track as the storm was approaching a deep, quasi-stationary, upper tropospheric trough over Asia. This trough produced strong southwesterly flow, which restricted outflow, which caused Kim to lose intensity. However, a deepening low cell in the tropical upper tropospheric trough (TUTT) approached Kim from the east, which enhanced upper-level outflow, which caused a secondary peak of about 220 km/h (140 mph).

On November 13, Kim made another landfall in central Luzon with winds at approximately 215 km/h (134 mph), passing about 65 km (40 mi) north of Manila and 9 km (5.6 mi) south of Clark Air Force Base. 7 hours after Kim's second landfall, the typhoon entered the South China Sea with an intensity of 120 km/h (75 mph). Even though the South China Sea had warm sea surface temperatures (SST), Kim never intensified due to a strong, cool northeast monsoon flow heading into the storm's environment. At the same time, the mid-latitude westerlies had significantly weakened the subtropical ridge, which separated Kim from the westerlies. Kim turned northward while rapidly decelerating in response to the steady southwesterly steering flow being produced by an approaching upper tropospheric trough. Increased wind shear began Kim's transition to an extratropical cyclone, while entering deep westerly flow. Kim eventually accelerated northeastward and became an extratropical cyclone by 0000Z on November 17 and merged with a weak frontal system east of Taiwan.

== Impact ==
=== Guam ===
In Guam, a peak wind gust of 142 km/h (88 mph) was recorded after the eye passed offshore. 22 homes were severely damaged on the southern portion of the island, with total losses estimated at US$600,000. There were no direct fatalities as a result of the typhoon in Guam.

=== Philippines ===
In Manila, a hotel caught fire caused by a lighted candle at the height of the storm, killing 47 people. At Clark Air Base, minor damage occurred with a roof blown off of a school building, and it was reported that trees also fell. In Luzon, 55 people drowned due to widespread flooding.

== See also ==
- Tropical cyclones in 1977
- 1977 Pacific typhoon season
- Typhoon Joan (1970)
- Typhoon Ketsana (2009)
- Typhoon Koppu (2015)
- Typhoon Vamco (2020)
- Typhoon Noru (2022)
