= Philippine Area of Responsibility =

Philippine weather forecasting domain in the Northwest Pacific

The Philippine Area of Responsibility.

The Philippine Area of Responsibility (PAR) is an area in the Northwestern Pacific where PAGASA, the Philippines' national meteorological agency, monitors weather occurrences. Significant weather disturbances, specifically tropical cyclones that enter or develop in the PAR, are given Philippine-specific names.

== Boundary ==
The area is bounded by six points namely (clockwise):

- 25°N 120°E
- 25°N 135°E
- 5°N 135°E
- 5°N 115°E
- 15°N 115°E
- 21°N 120°E

This area encompasses almost all of the exclusive economic zone territory of the Philippines, except for the southernmost portions of the province of Tawi-Tawi, and some of the country's claimed islands in the Spratlys. The area also includes the main island of Palau, most of Taiwan, as well as portions of the Malaysian state of Sabah, the Japanese prefecture of Okinawa (Miyakojima, Tarama, Ishigaki, Taketomi, Yonaguni) and a small patch of land in Brunei (Brunei–Muara District).

== Function ==
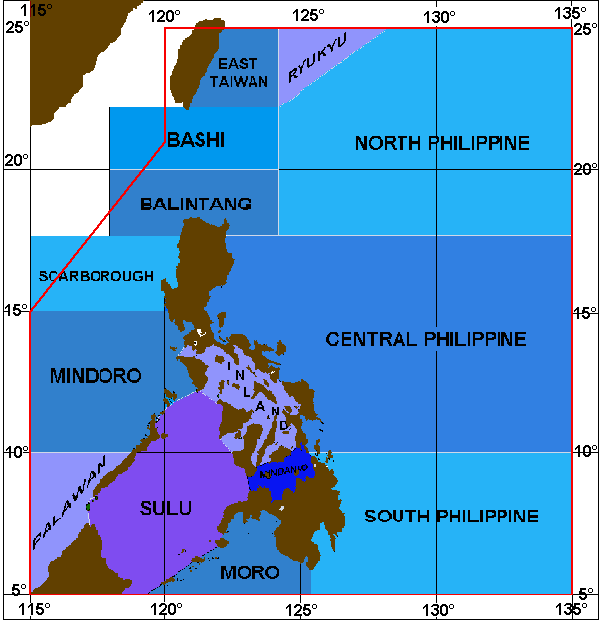
Shipping zones within the PAR.

The establishing decree of PAGASA mandates the weather agency to monitor weather occurrences occurring within the PAR.

Tropical cyclones are only assigned local names by PAGASA when they enter or develop within the PAR. These names are provided in parallel with internationally recognized names designated by the Japan Meteorological Agency (in its role as the Regional Specialized Meteorological Centre for the Northwest Pacific Ocean basin). The rationale for providing local names is that it is felt that Filipinos will respond more to familiar names and that it helps to underscore that these named weather disturbances pose a direct threat to the country. Furthermore, PAGASA provides names earlier when a low-pressure area becomes a tropical depression, in contrast to international names that are only issued when a tropical cyclone reaches tropical storm strength (65 km/h and higher), due to the fact that tropical depressions can still cause flooding and other damage.

When a named weather disturbance within the PAR has made or is expected to make landfall in the Philippines, PAGASA is mandated to issue Tropical Cyclone Bulletins every three or six hours. If the weather disturbance is not affecting land, the weather agency has to issue Tropical Cyclone Bulletins every 12 hours.

=== Other areas forecasting domains ===
The Philippine Area of Responsibility (red), Tropical Cyclone Advisory Domain (orange), and Tropical Cyclone Information Domain (purple)

Aside from the PAR, PAGASA forecasters have two other areas of responsibilities for tropical cyclone monitoring: the Tropical Cyclone Advisory Domain (TCAD) and the Tropical Cyclone Information Domain (TCID). Together with the PAR, these three areas of the Northwest Pacific Basin are collectively called domains. Since most tropical cyclones come from the broad expanse of ocean east of the country, the eastern boundaries of the PAR, TCAD and TCID are farther from the archipelago than the western boundaries.

The TCAD, is located between the PAR and the TCID. TCAD tropical cyclones are too far to have any direct effect to the country but are close enough for monitoring by the PAGASA and prompts the agency to issue a Tropical Cyclone Advisory (a less serious form of tropical cyclone bulletin than the Tropical Cyclone Bulletin). The TCAD includes the area bounded by the imaginary lines connecting the coordinates: 4°N 114°E, 27°N 114°E, 27°N 145°E, 4°N 145°E. Note that though the TCAD completely encloses the PAR, it does not include the area within the PAR.

On the other hand, the TCID is the largest and the outermost domain of PAGASA. TCID tropical cyclones are of least concern for PAGASA but are still necessary enough for monitoring and public awareness. The TCID is the area enclosed by the imaginary lines connecting the coordinates: 0°N 110°E, 27°N 110°E, 27°N 155°E, 0°N 155°E. Similarly, the TCID excludes the area enclosed by the PAR and the TCAD.
