= 2022 Pacific typhoon season =

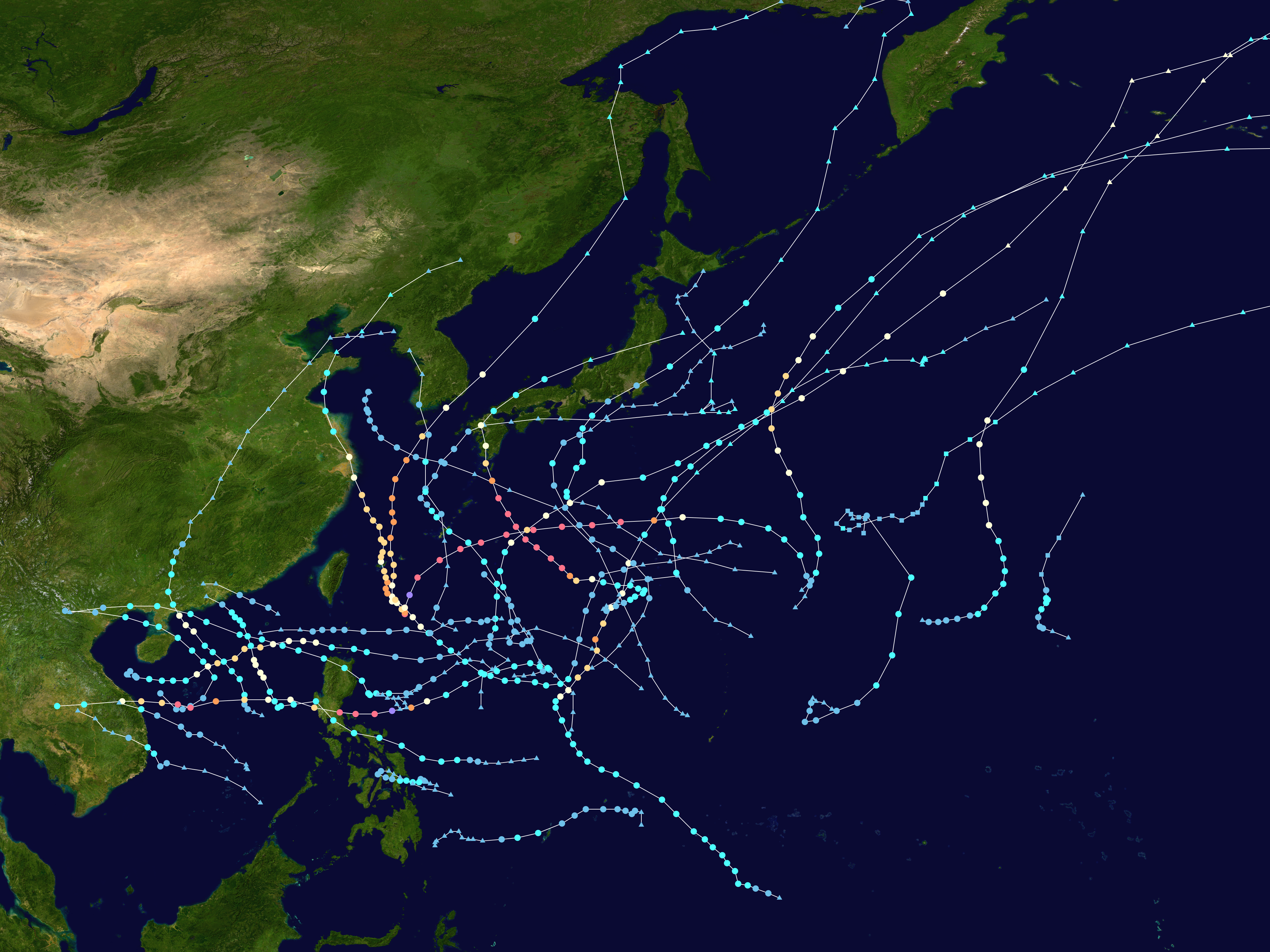
- Season summary map

Seasonal boundaries
- First system formed: January 27, 2022
- Last system dissipated: December 12, 2022

Strongest storm
- Name: Nanmadol
  - Maximum winds: 195 km/h (120 mph) (10-minute sustained)
  - Lowest pressure: 910 hPa (mbar)

Seasonal statistics
- Total depressions: 37
- Total storms: 25
- Typhoons: 10
- Very strong typhoons: 5
- Violent typhoons: 2
- Total fatalities: 518 total
- Total damage: $7.18 billion (2022 USD)

Related articles
- 2022 Atlantic hurricane season; 2022 Pacific hurricane season; 2022 North Indian Ocean cyclone season

The 2022 Pacific typhoon season was the third consecutive season to have below average tropical cyclone activity, with twenty-five named storms forming. Of the tropical storms, ten became typhoons, and three storms would intensify into super typhoons. The season saw near-average activity by named storm count, although many of the storms were weak and short-lived, particularly towards the end of the season. This low activity was caused by an unusually strong La Niña that had persisted from 2020. The season's first named storm, Malakas, developed on April 6, while the last named storm, Pakhar, dissipated on December 12. The season's first typhoon, Malakas, reached typhoon status on April 12. The season ran throughout 2022, though most tropical cyclones typically develop between May and October. Tropical storms Megi and Nalgae were responsible for more than half of the casualties, while typhoons Hinnamnor and Nanmadol, and Tropical Storm Talas both caused $1 billion in damages.

The scope of this article is limited to the Pacific Ocean to the north of the equator between 100°E and 180th meridian. Within the northwestern Pacific Ocean, there are two separate agencies that assign names to tropical cyclones which can often result in a cyclone having two names. The Japan Meteorological Agency (JMA) (Note: The Japan Meteorological Agency is the official Regional Specialized Meteorological Center for the western Pacific Ocean.) named tropical cyclones that were judged to have 10-minute sustained wind speeds of at least 65 km/h (40 mph) anywhere in the basin, whilst the Philippine Atmospheric, Geophysical and Astronomical Services Administration (PAGASA) assigned names to tropical cyclones which moved into or formed as a tropical depression in the Philippine Area of Responsibility (PAR) located between 135°E and 115°E and between 5°N and 25°N regardless of whether or not a tropical cyclone has already been given a name by the JMA. Tropical depressions that were monitored by the United States' Joint Typhoon Warning Center (JTWC) (Note: The Joint Typhoon Warning Center is a joint United States Navy – United States Air Force task force that issues tropical cyclone warnings for the western Pacific Ocean and other regions.) (Note: A super typhoon is an unofficial category used by the Joint Typhoon Warning Center (JTWC) for a typhoon with winds of at least 240 km/h (150 mph).) were given a number with a "W" suffix.

== Seasonal forecasts ==
TSR forecasts Date	Tropical storms	Total Typhoons	Intense TCs	ACE	Ref.
Average (1965–2021)	25.9	16.2	8.8	293	
May 5, 2022	23	13	7	293	
July 6, 2022	23	13	7	217	
August 9, 2022	23	14	6	166	
Other forecasts Date	Forecast Center	Period		Systems	Ref.
December 22, 2021	PAGASA	January–March		0–3 tropical cyclones	
December 22, 2021	PAGASA	April–June		1–4 tropical cyclones	
June 29, 2022	PAGASA	July–September		3–6 tropical cyclones	
June 29, 2022	PAGASA	October–December		5–9 tropical cyclones	
2022 season	Forecast Center	Tropical cyclones	Tropical storms	Typhoons	Ref.
Actual activity:	JMA	37	25	10	
Actual activity:	JTWC	29	25	13	
Actual activity:	PAGASA	18	14	6	

During the year, several national meteorological services and scientific agencies forecast how many tropical cyclones, tropical storms, and typhoons will form during a season and/or how many tropical cyclones will affect a particular country. These agencies included the Tropical Storm Risk (TSR) Consortium of University College London, PAGASA and Taiwan's Central Weather Bureau. The first forecast was released by PAGASA on December 22, 2021, in their monthly seasonal climate outlook predicting the first half of 2022. They predicted that only 0–3 tropical cyclones were expected to form or enter the Philippine Area of Responsibility between January and March, while 1–4 tropical cyclones are expected to form between April and June. PAGASA also stated that ongoing La Niña conditions could last until it transitions back into ENSO-neutral conditions by the second quarter of 2022.

On May 5, Tropical Storm Risk (TSR) issued its first forecast for the 2022 season with ongoing La Niña still anticipated until roughly the third quarter of the year, TSR predicted that tropical activity for 2022 will be slightly below average predicting 23 named storms, 13 typhoons and 7 intense typhoons. TSR remained constant with their prediction in their second forecast in July. On August 9, TSR released their third and final forecast for the season, with the only changes is increasing their typhoon numbers by 14, and decreasing the intense typhoon numbers down to 6. The ACE Index forecast was significantly lowered to 166, and was based on the then-current index as of early August and the reduction of cyclonic activity in the month of June.

== Systems ==
=== Tropical Depression 01W ===
- Tropical depression (JMA)
- Tropical storm (SSHWS)
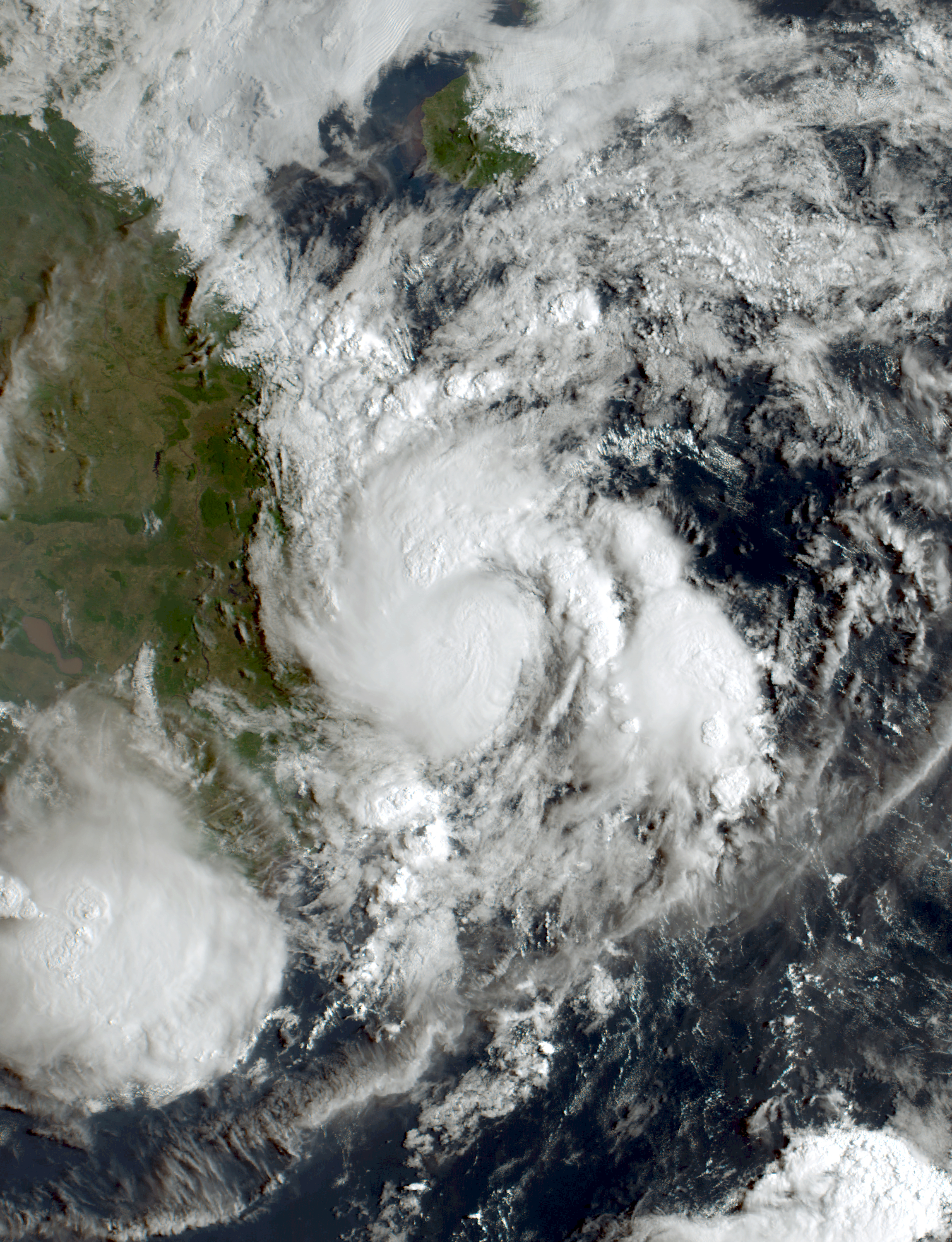
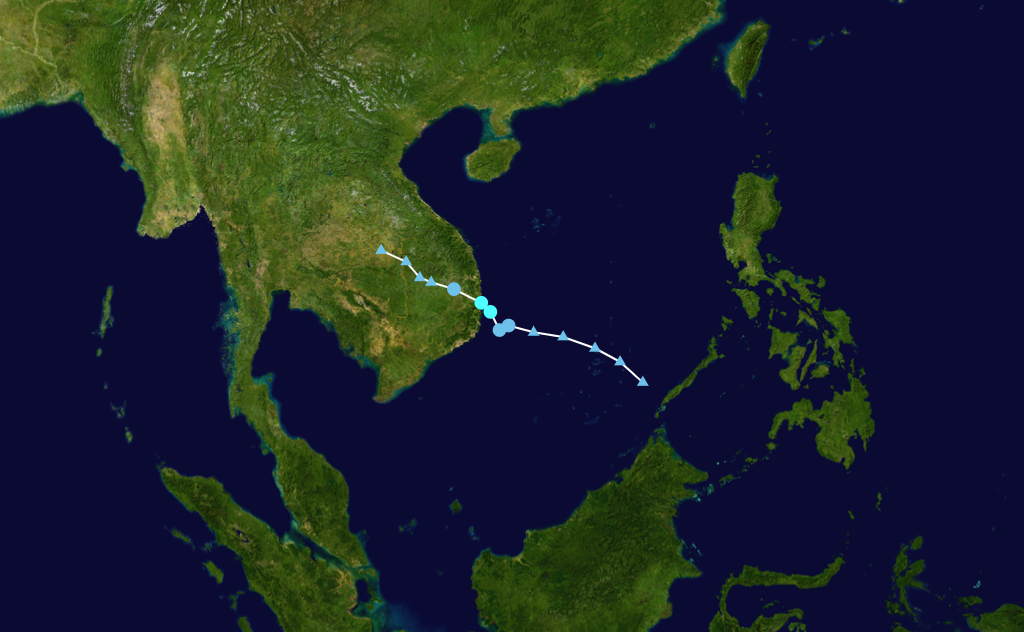
- Duration: March 29 – March 31
- Peak intensity: <55 km/h (35 mph) (10-min); 1006 hPa (mbar)

A tropical disturbance formed after crossing Palawan on late March. The disturbance would develop into a low-pressure area southeast of Da Nang, Vietnam, where it would intensify into the first tropical depression of the season, at 18:00 UTC on March 29. At 21:00 UTC at the same day, the JTWC issued a Tropical Cyclone Formation Alert (TCFA) for the system after its development of a tropical depression. On the next day, the agency upgraded to a tropical depression, assigning it the designation 01W. Shortly after, the agency issued their final advisory on the system after it made landfall in the southeastern part of Vietnam on March 30, shortly after dissipating.

In Vietnam, floods caused by the storm have killed six people. The storm left one missing and eight injured. Flooding also caused two houses to collapse. Overall damages reach 3.52 trillion VND (US$148.95 million).

In real-time, the JTWC assessed that the system had peaked as a tropical depression, however in the JTWC's post-analysis of 2023, 01W would be recognized as a tropical storm.

=== Typhoon Malakas (Basyang) ===
- Very strong typhoon (JMA)
- Category 3 typhoon (SSHWS)
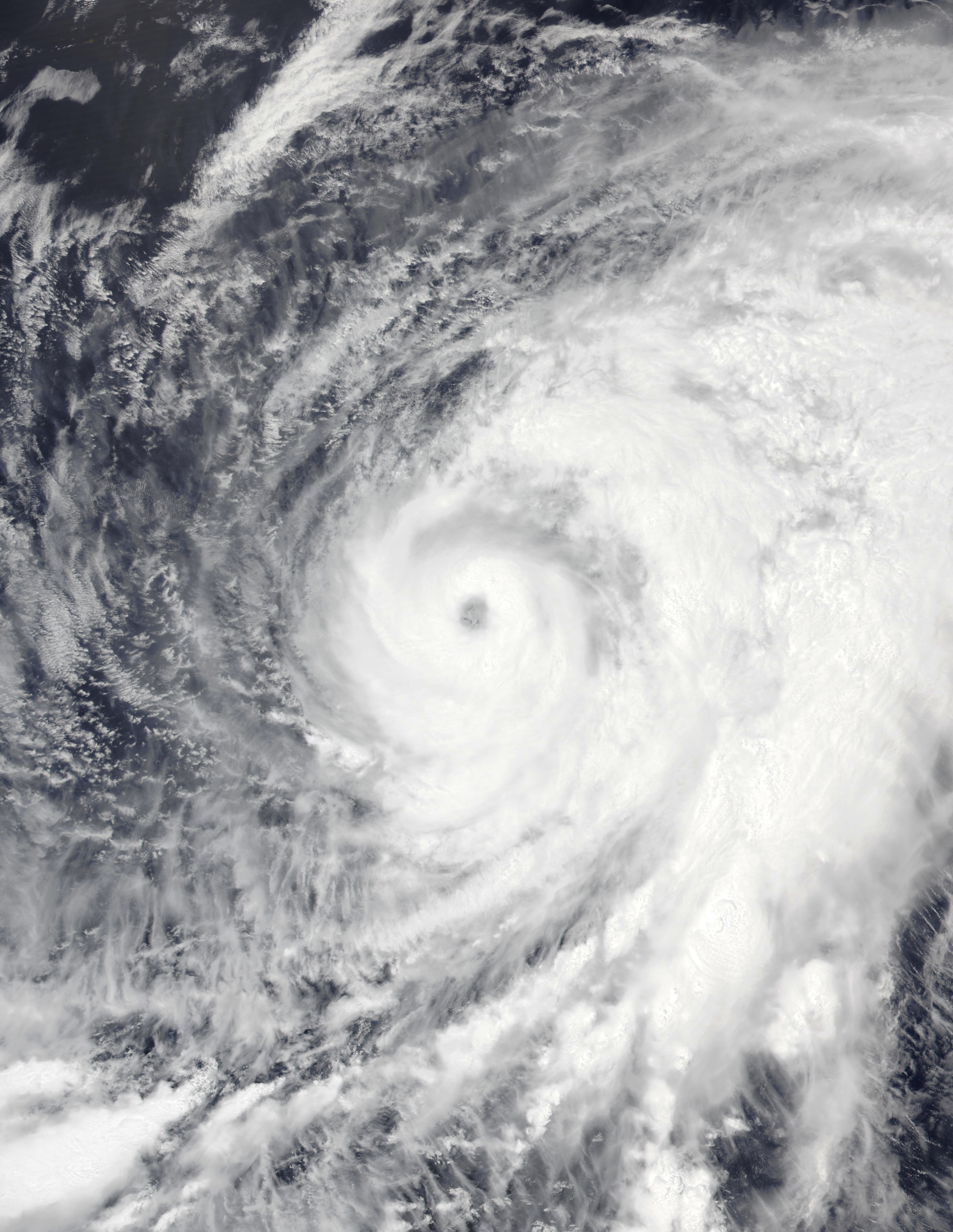
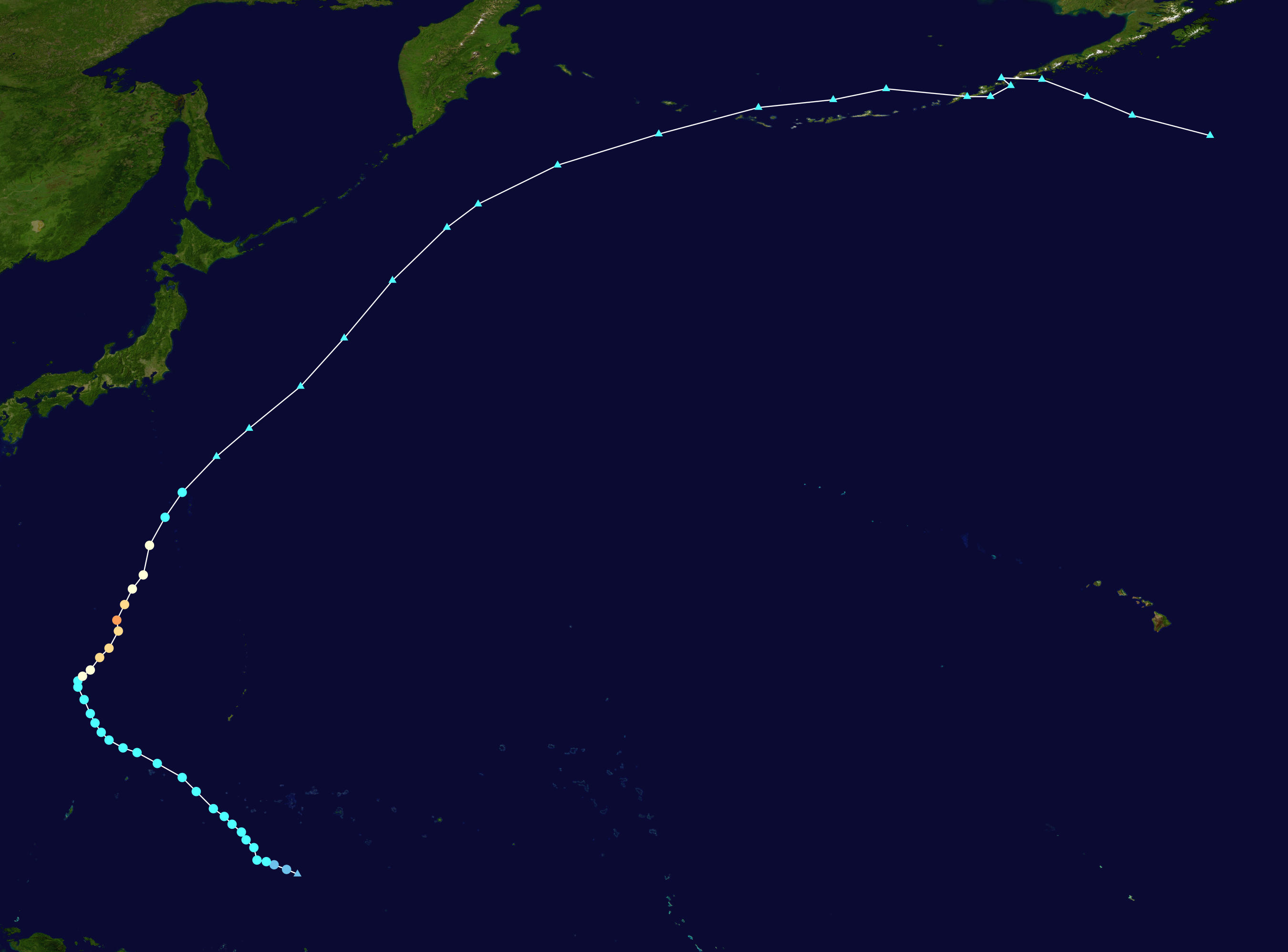
- Duration: April 6 – April 15
- Peak intensity: 165 km/h (105 mph) (10-min); 945 hPa (mbar)

The JTWC first noted the existence of a tropical disturbance on April 3. Favorable conditions near the system helped it develop, with the JMA recognizing the system as a tropical depression on April 6. Later in the day, the JTWC issued a TCFA for the system. The following day, the JTWC recognized the system as a tropical depression and gave it the designation 02W. At 21:00 UTC, the JTWC then upgraded it to a tropical storm. On April 8, the system developed into a tropical storm and was named Malakas by the JMA. Malakas continued traveling over the Pacific Ocean, and began to slowly intensify, becoming a severe tropical storm on the April 11, then a typhoon by April 12. At around the same time, it entered the Philippine Area of Responsibility (PAR), receiving the local name of Basyang from the PAGASA at 03:00 UTC. Malakas then lingered for a while at the border of the PAR before eventually exiting 5 hours later, while intensifying into a Category 2-equivalent typhoon. Malakas then continued its intensification, reaching Category 3-equivalent status later that day, and into a Category 4-equivalent typhoon with 210 km/h (130 mph) 1-minute sustained winds on April 13, reaching its peak intensity. The following day, Malakas weakened to a Category 3-equivalent typhoon as its eye structure degraded. It further weakened to Category 1-equivalent status later in the day. By April 15, it began its transition into an extratropical cyclone, with its structure rapidly deteriorating. The JTWC gave their final warning on the system at 09:00 UTC of the same day, while the JMA did the same around 18:00 UTC.

Malakas did not affect any major land areas. However, due to its name being nearly homophonous to a vulgar Greek slang term (μαλάκας means "wanker"), the name Malakas was retired and will never be used again for a Pacific typhoon name. In 2024, it was announced to be replaced with Amuyao (a mountain in Mountain Province) for future seasons.

=== Tropical Storm Megi (Agaton) ===
- Tropical storm (JMA)
- Tropical storm (SSHWS)
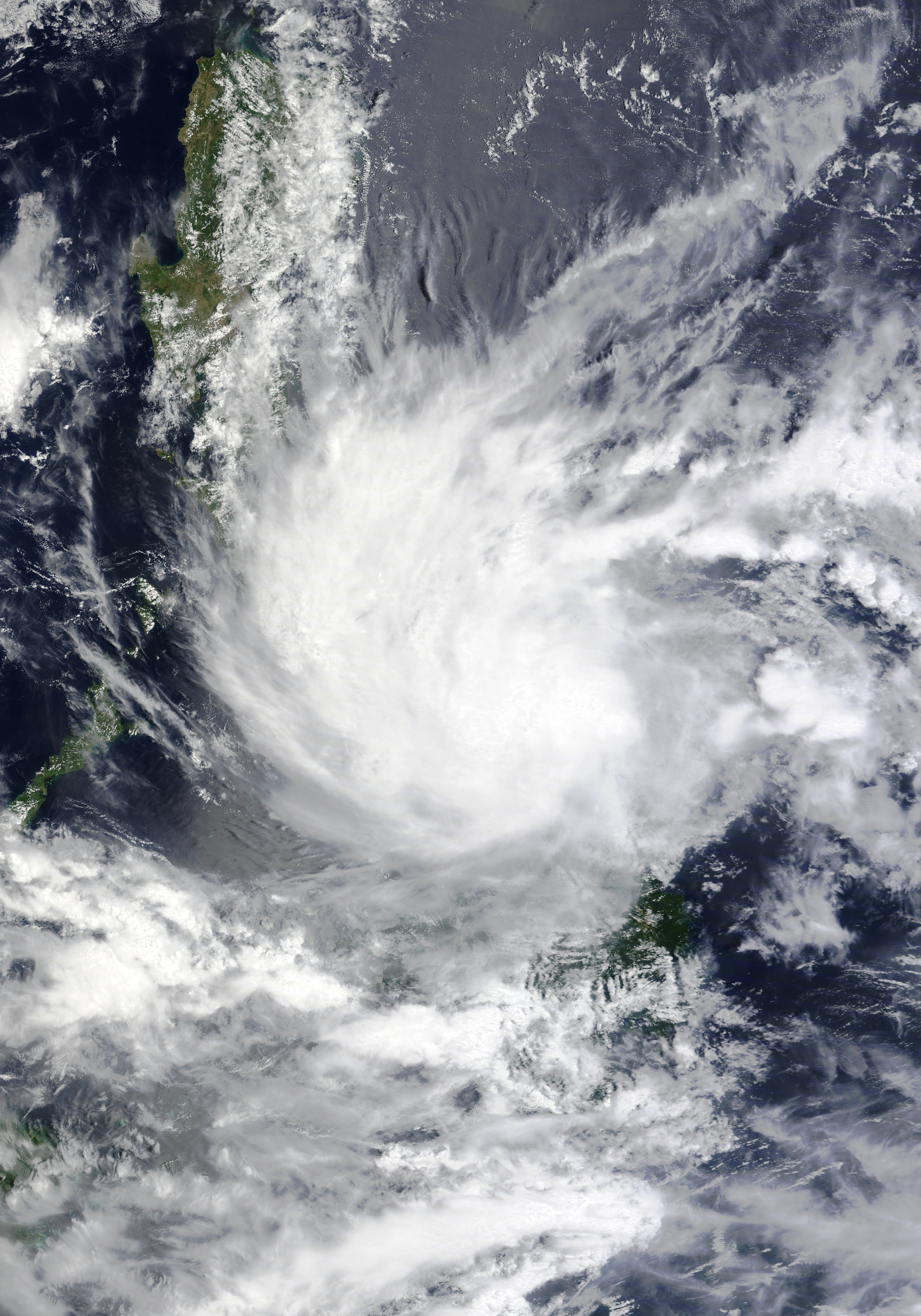
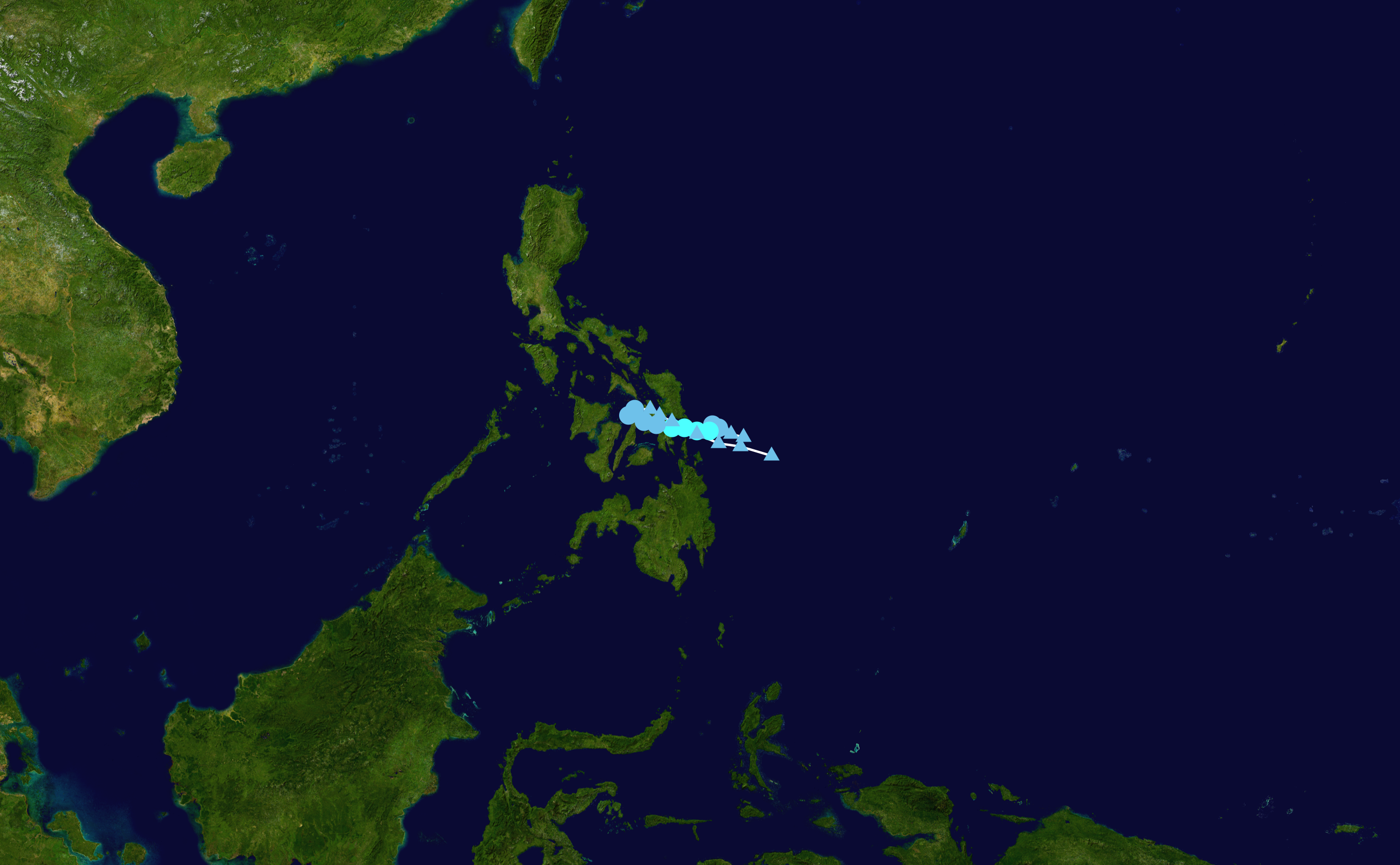
- Duration: April 8 – April 12
- Peak intensity: 75 km/h (45 mph) (10-min); 996 hPa (mbar)

On April 8, the JTWC noted an area of convection persisting around 359 nautical miles (665 km; 413 mi) west-northwest of Palau. Since the disturbance was in an environment favorable for development, the JMA recognized the system as a tropical depression east of Visayas later that day. Around the same time, the PAGASA announced that the system had developed into a tropical depression, resulting in it being named Agaton by the agency. PAGASA would begin issuing Tropical Cyclone Bulletins (TCBs) for the storm later that day. On the next day, the JTWC later issued a TCFA for the system. At 03:00 UTC, the agency upgraded it to a tropical depression and assigned it the identifier 03W. On April 10, the JMA upgraded it to a tropical storm, naming it Megi. Megi would make its first landfall in Calicoan Island, Guiuan at 07:30 PHT (23:30 UTC). Megi then stalled in the Leyte Gulf for hours before making its second landfall in Basey, Samar.

Megi then weakened into a tropical depression after lingering over the islands of Samar and Leyte, resulting in PAGASA removing all warning signals for the system before it dissipated into a remnant low on the midnight of April 13.

From April 8 to April 10, the storm meandered along the Eastern Visayas region, dumping heavy rain on the region. PAGASA raised storm signals up to Signal No. 2 during the storm's onslaught. Cebu City was placed under a state of calamity following the heavy rain. Megi killed 214 people, which made it the deadliest tropical cyclone in the Philippines to form in May. Megi would also injure eight people, leave 134 people missing, and capsize a cargo boat in Ormoc following strong rains, winds, and flash floods which also displaced over 136,390 individuals. The Department of Agriculture estimated agricultural damage to reach ₱3.27 billion, while the Department of Public Works and Highways estimated infrastructural damage at ₱1.45 billion. Total damage from the storm was valued at ₱4.72 billion (US$90.8 million).

=== Typhoon Chaba (Caloy) ===
- Typhoon (JMA)
- Category 1 typhoon (SSHWS)
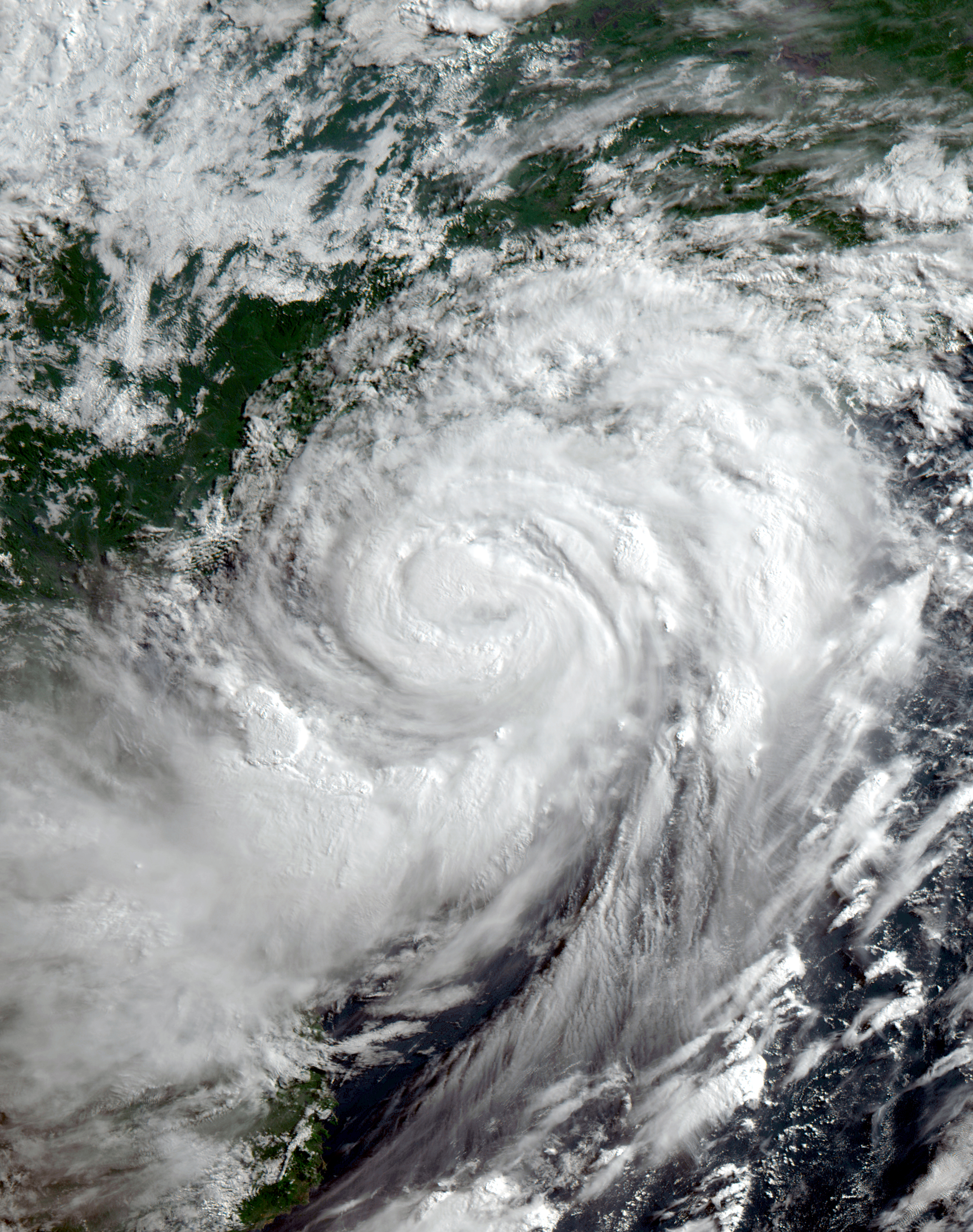
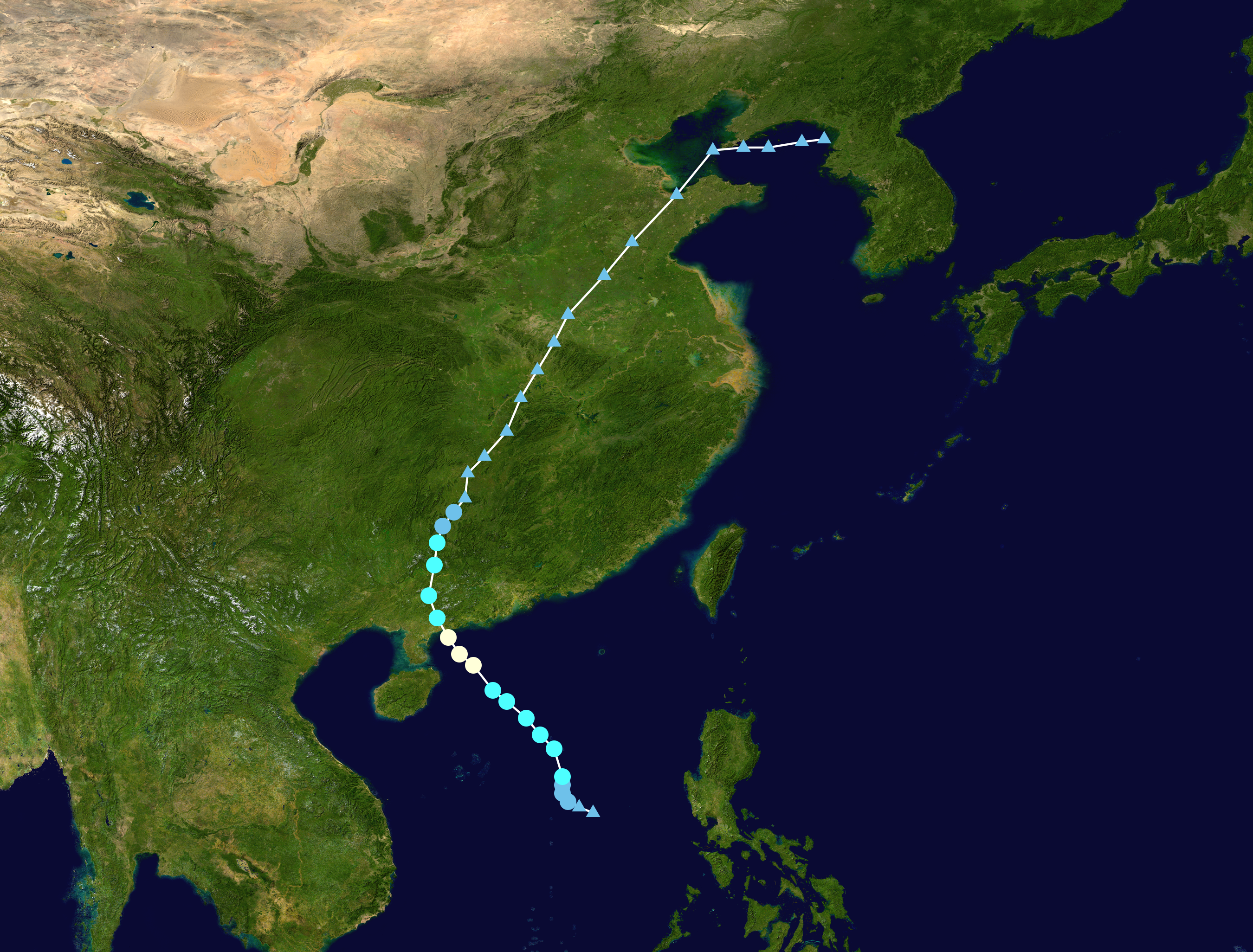
- Duration: June 28 – July 5
- Peak intensity: 130 km/h (80 mph) (10-min); 965 hPa (mbar)

A low-pressure area west of Luzon developed into a tropical depression on June 28. At 20:00 PHT (12:00 UTC), the PAGASA had recognized the storm's development into a tropical depression, began issuing advisories, and named the system Caloy. The following day, the JTWC issued a TCFA for the system. Caloy remained almost stationary in the South China Sea before slowly moving northwestwards, eventually leaving the Philippine Area of Responsibility by 15:00 UTC. As the PAGASA issued its last bulletin on the tropical depression, the JTWC began issuing warnings for the storm and was given the designation 04W. Later, the Japan Meteorological Agency upgraded Caloy into a tropical storm, naming it Chaba. Chaba continued to intensify in the South China Sea, later being upgraded into a severe tropical storm northeast of the Paracel Islands. Typhoon Chaba's outer rainbands produced at least three tornadoes, which impacted Shantou, Chaozhou, and Foshan. On July 1 at 21:00 UTC, the JTWC upgraded Chaba to a typhoon, with the JMA doing the same 3 hours later on July 2 at 0:00 UTC. Later that day at 07:00 UTC, it made landfall on Maoming. Shortly after its landfall, both the JMA and the JTWC assessed that Chaba lost typhoon status, downgrading Chaba to a severe tropical storm and to a tropical storm respectively. The JTWC then issued their final warning on Chaba at 15:00 UTC. Shortly after, the JMA downgraded Chaba to a tropical storm; it was further downgraded to a tropical depression on July 3 at 06:00 UTC.

160 nautical miles (300 km; 180 mi) southwest of Hong Kong, the Fujing 001, a crane vessel tasked in assisting with the construction of an offshore wind farm, split in half and quickly sunk—leaving 26 crew members missing. Three of the 30 crew members were rescued, seen in a video published online by the Hong Kong Government Flying Service. Another person was rescued by July 4, bringing the total number of people rescued to four. Twelve bodies from the ship were recovered. More than 400 flights were suspended in Hainan; one person was injured in Macau.

=== Tropical Storm Aere (Domeng) ===
- Tropical storm (JMA)
- Tropical storm (SSHWS)
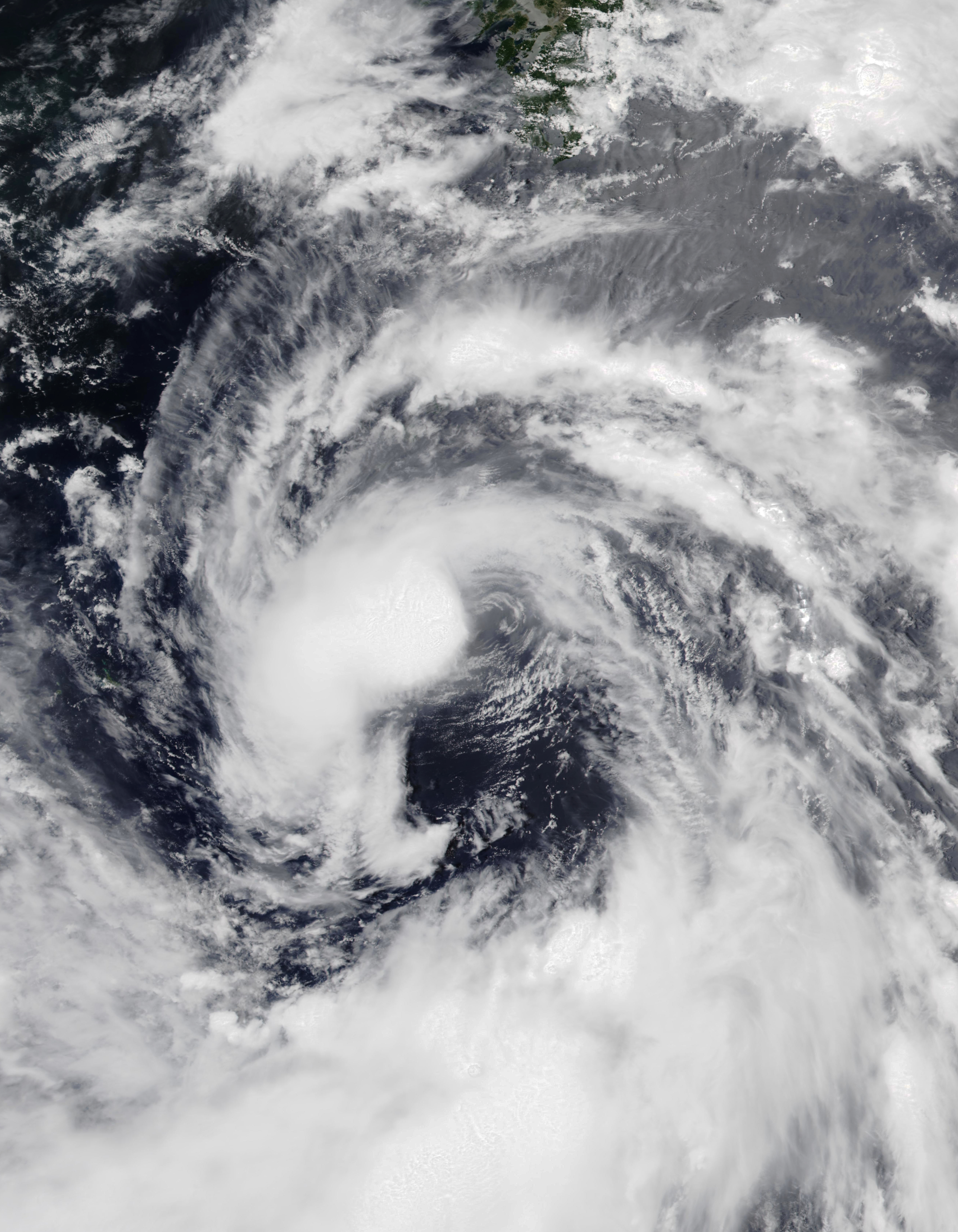
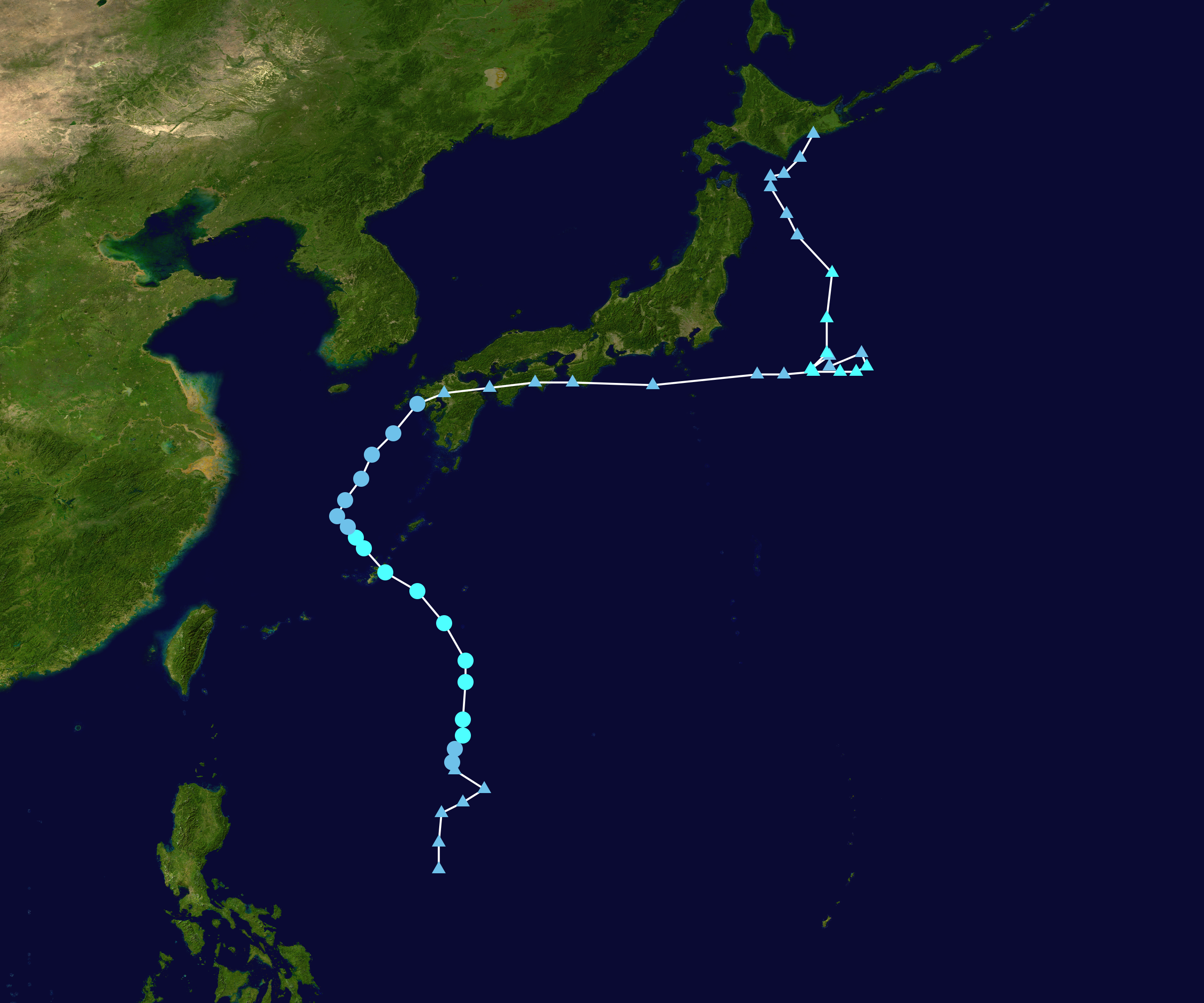
- Duration: June 30 – July 4
- Peak intensity: 85 km/h (50 mph) (10-min); 994 hPa (mbar)

On June 30, the JTWC began issuing TCFAs for a tropical disturbance in the Philippine Sea, 530 nautical miles (980 km; 610 mi) south-southeast of Kadena Air Base in Japan. At 14:00 PHT (06:00 UTC), the PAGASA recognized the disturbance's formation into a tropical depression, began issuing tropical cyclone bulletins, and named the system Domeng. The JMA recognized the storm as a tropical depression at 12:00 UTC on the same day; the JTWC followed shortly after. On the next day, the Japan Meteorological Agency upgraded Domeng into a tropical storm and named it Aere as it was east of Batanes. Aere then continued to track north and at 03:00 UTC on July 2, Aere left the Philippine Area of Responsibility; the PAGASA released its final bulletin on the storm shortly after. Later that day, Aere made landfall over Okinawa. On July 3 at 09:00 UTC, the JTWC downgraded Aere to a tropical depression. However, three days later, the JTWC released another unofficial bulletin, reclassifying this disturbance as a subtropical storm, with an estimated pressure of 1000 hPa.

=== Tropical Storm Songda ===
- Tropical storm (JMA)
- Tropical depression (SSHWS)
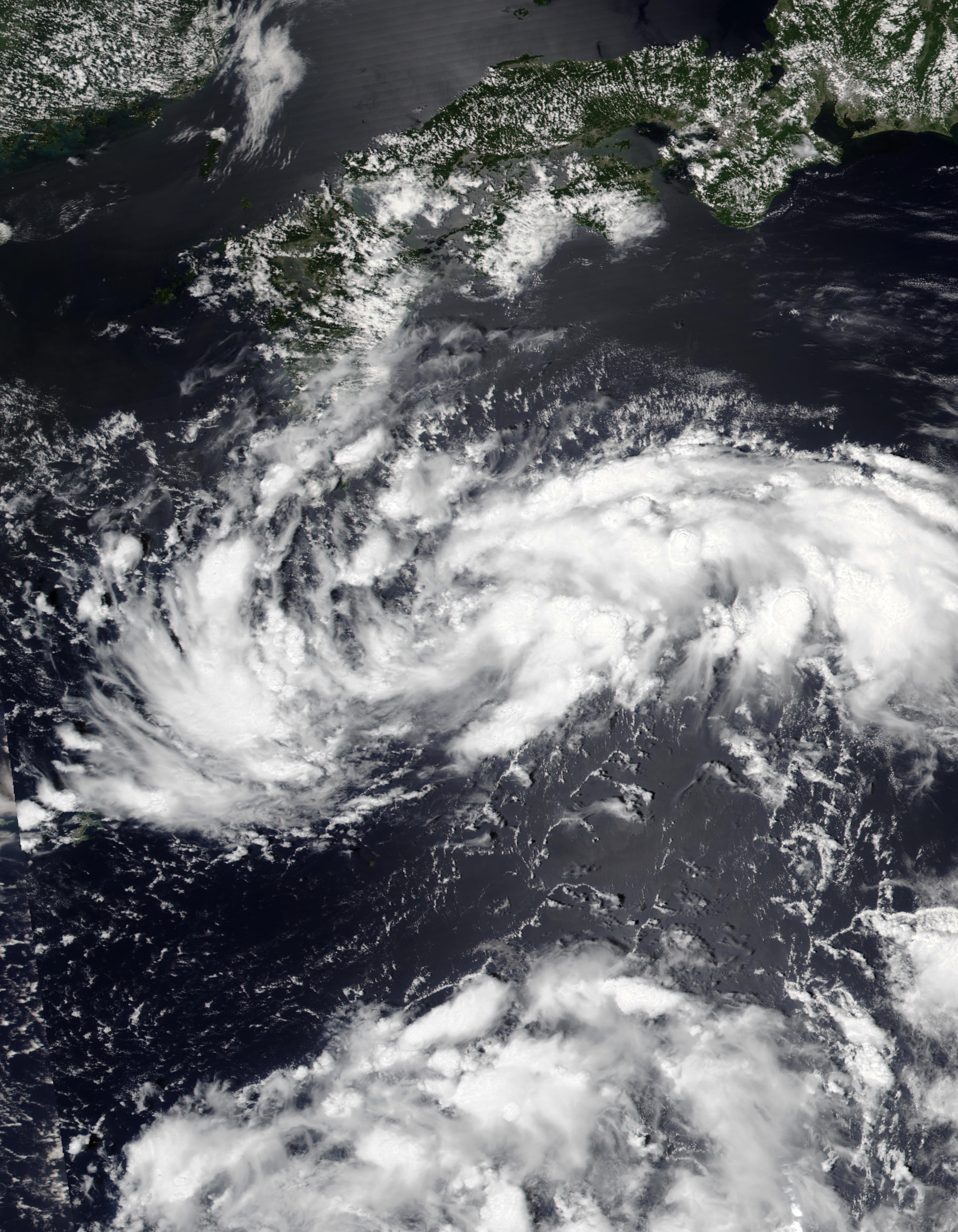
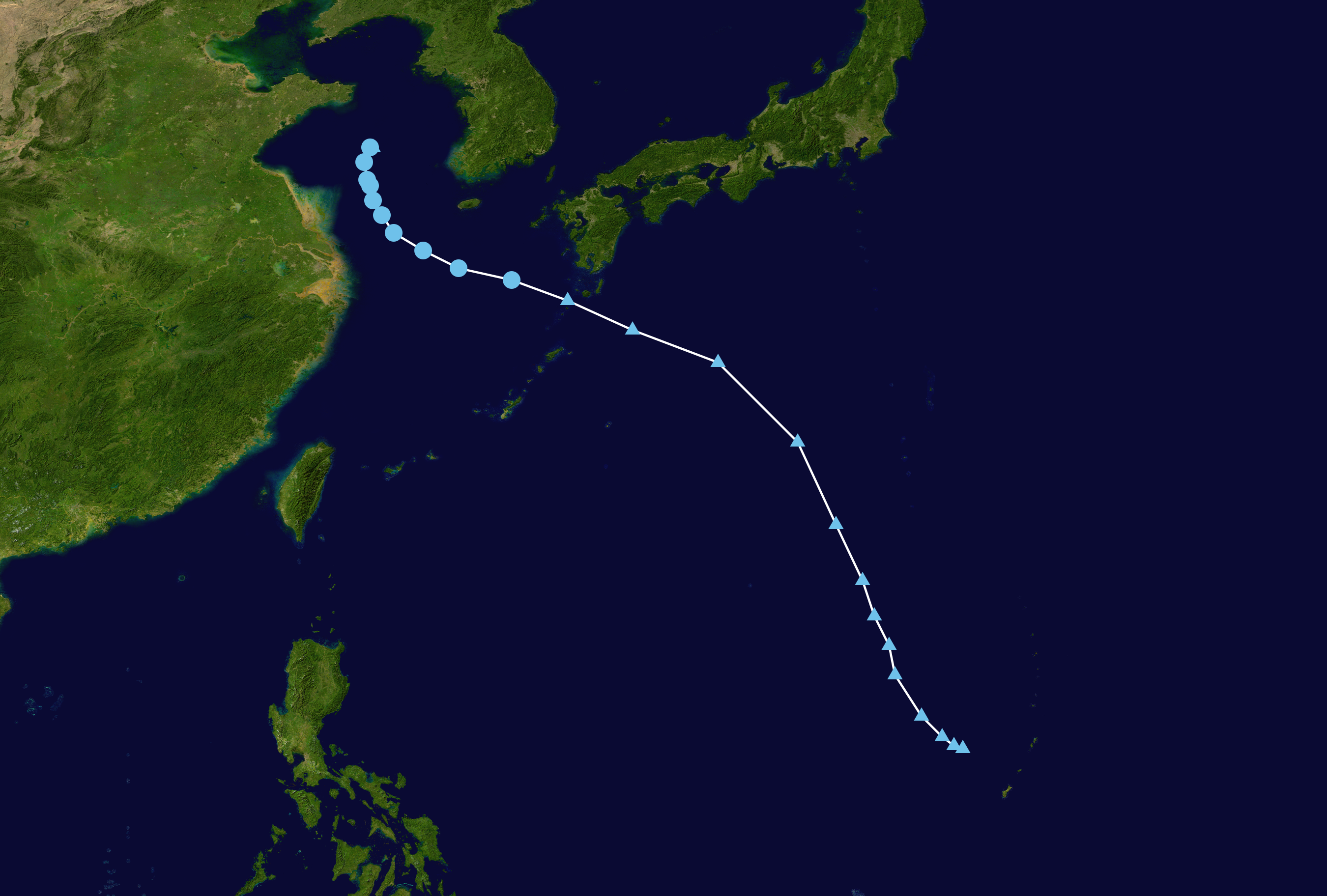
- Duration: July 26 – August 1
- Peak intensity: 75 km/h (45 mph) (10-min); 996 hPa (mbar)

On July 26, a low-pressure area northwest of the Mariana Islands developed into a tropical depression. The system tracked northwest along the periphery of a subtropical high, with limited intensification. After some development while over the Philippine Sea on July 28, the JMA upgraded the system to a tropical storm, giving it the name Songda. The JTWC recognized the system's formation into a tropical depression on July 29, three days after the JMA. Songda continued tracking northwestwards, passing over the waters of Kagoshima Prefecture on July 30, slowing down over the Yellow Sea. It then recurved towards mainland Korea, losing its strength as it entered unfavorable conditions which sheared its center. Songda dissipated on August 1; its remnants made landfall over North Korea on August 2.

Songda caused heavy rainfall over the Kyushu and Shikoku regions of Japan and over Jeju Island in South Korea. Despite strong winds and around 206 millimetres (8.1 in) of rain, no damages were reported on Jeju Island.

=== Tropical Storm Trases (Ester) ===
- Tropical storm (JMA)
- Tropical storm (SSHWS)
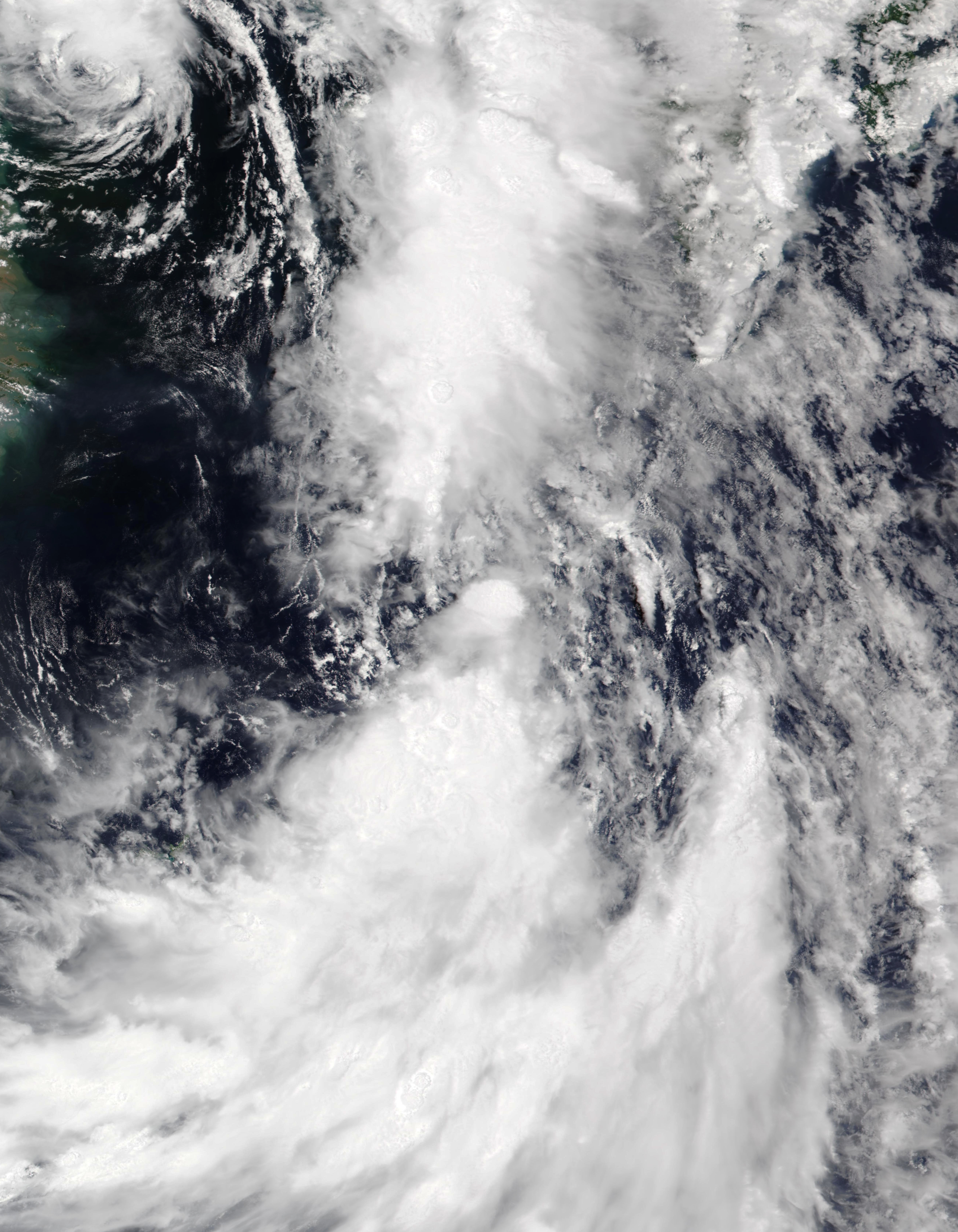
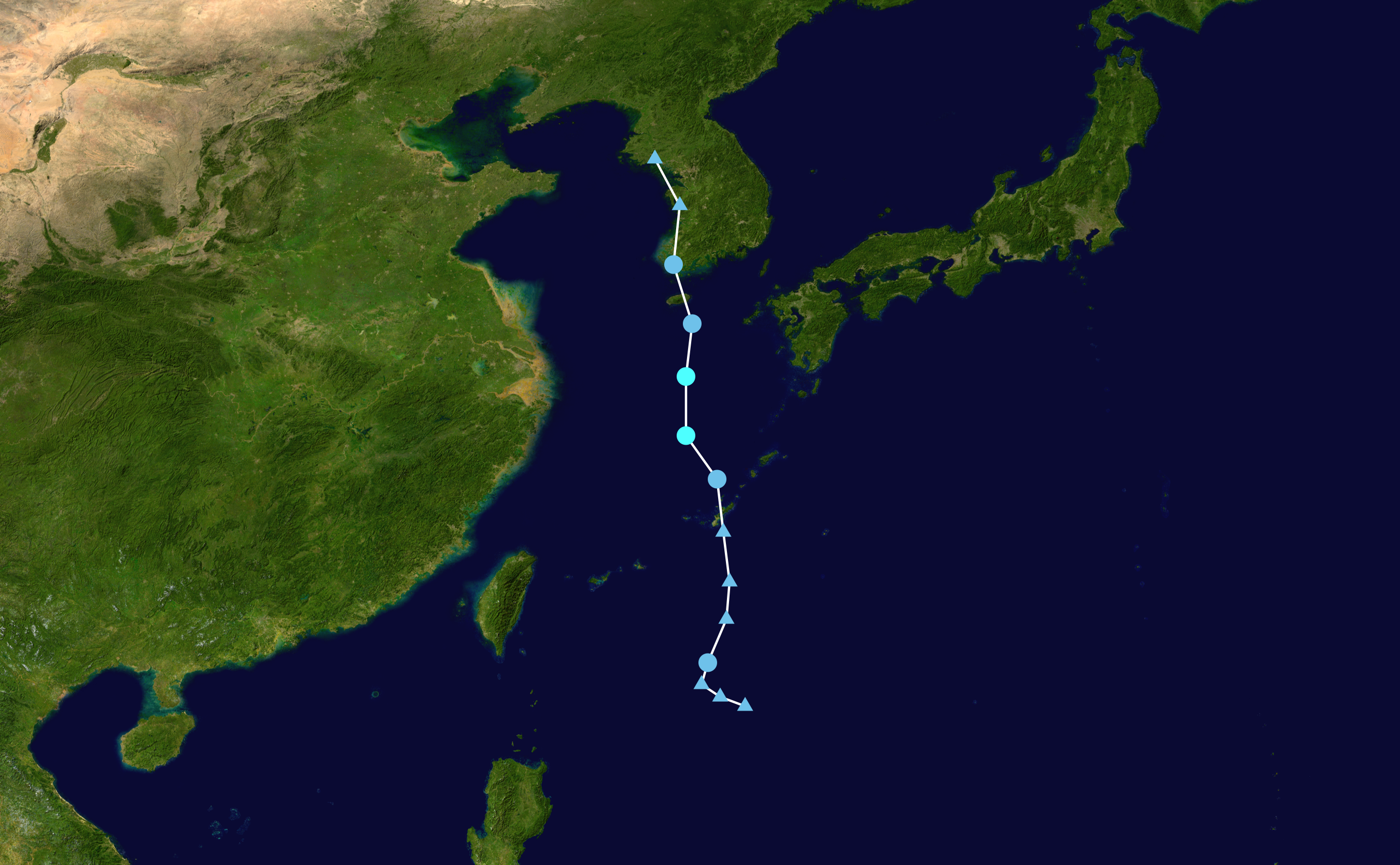
- Duration: July 29 – August 1
- Peak intensity: 65 km/h (40 mph) (10-min); 998 hPa (mbar)

A low-pressure area from a massive monsoon gyre developed into a tropical depression southeast of the Ryukyu Islands on July 29. The PAGASA followed suit in upgrading it, then named the system Ester. Trases moved generally northward over the Philippine Sea, maintaining its strength as it did so. Trases exited the Philippine Area of Responsibility at 05:00 PHT (21:00 UTC) on July 31; the PAGASA issued their last bulletin on the storm at 11:00 PHT (03:00 UTC). As Trases neared the Okinawa Islands, the JMA upgraded it into a tropical storm, and it was given the name Trases, which replaced the name Sarika.

Trases then passed over Okinawa, and later made landfall in Jeju Island. The JTWC issued a TCFA. Later, they upgraded Trases into a tropical depression, and gave the designation of 07W. Trases then interacted with the nearby Tropical Depression Songda, and made a second landfall on the mainland of South Korea on August 1. Not long after, the JMA downgraded Trases into a tropical depression, and the JTWC issued their last advisory on it as it lingered near the western coast of South Korea.

=== Tropical Depression 08W ===
- Tropical depression (JMA)
- Tropical depression (SSHWS)
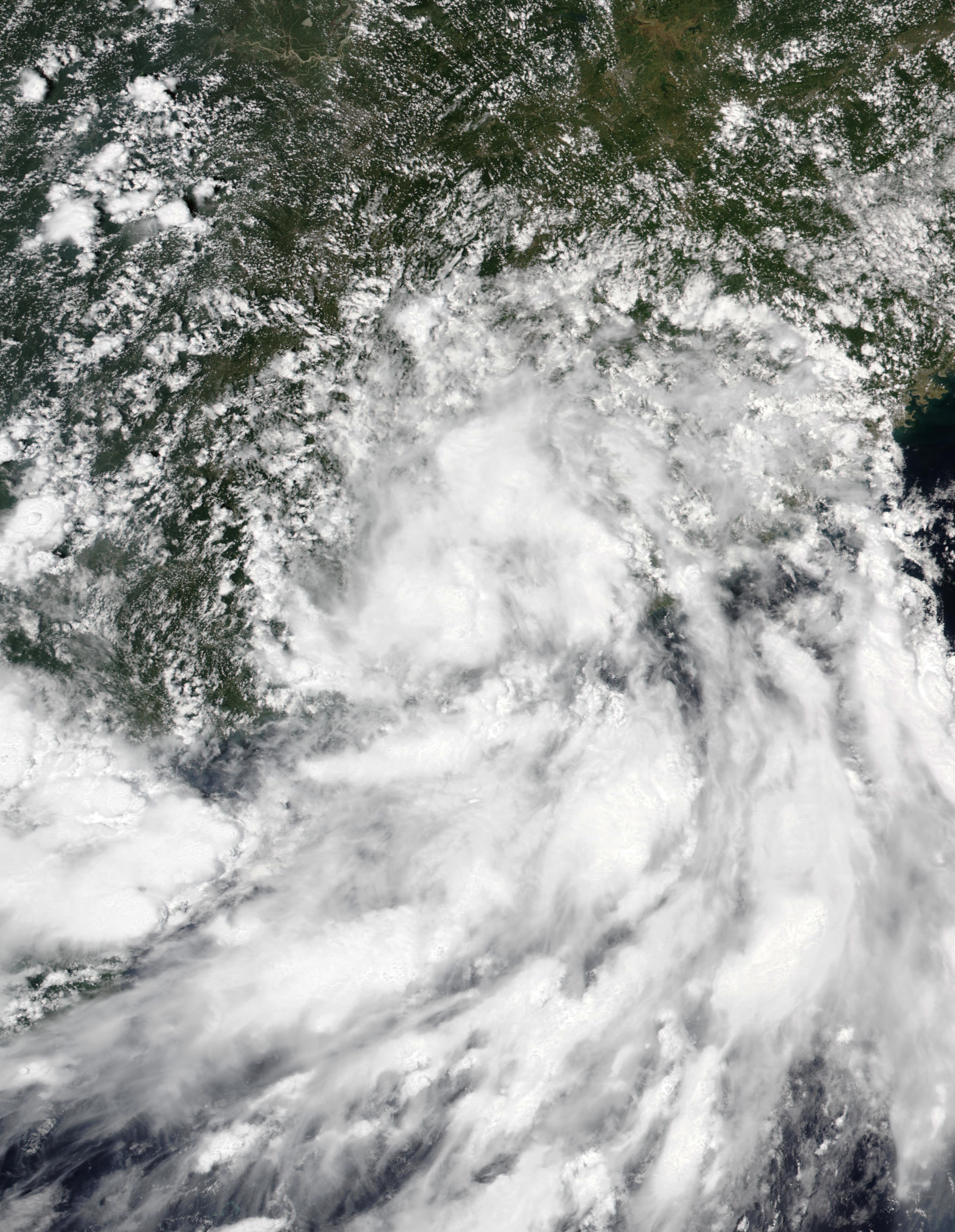
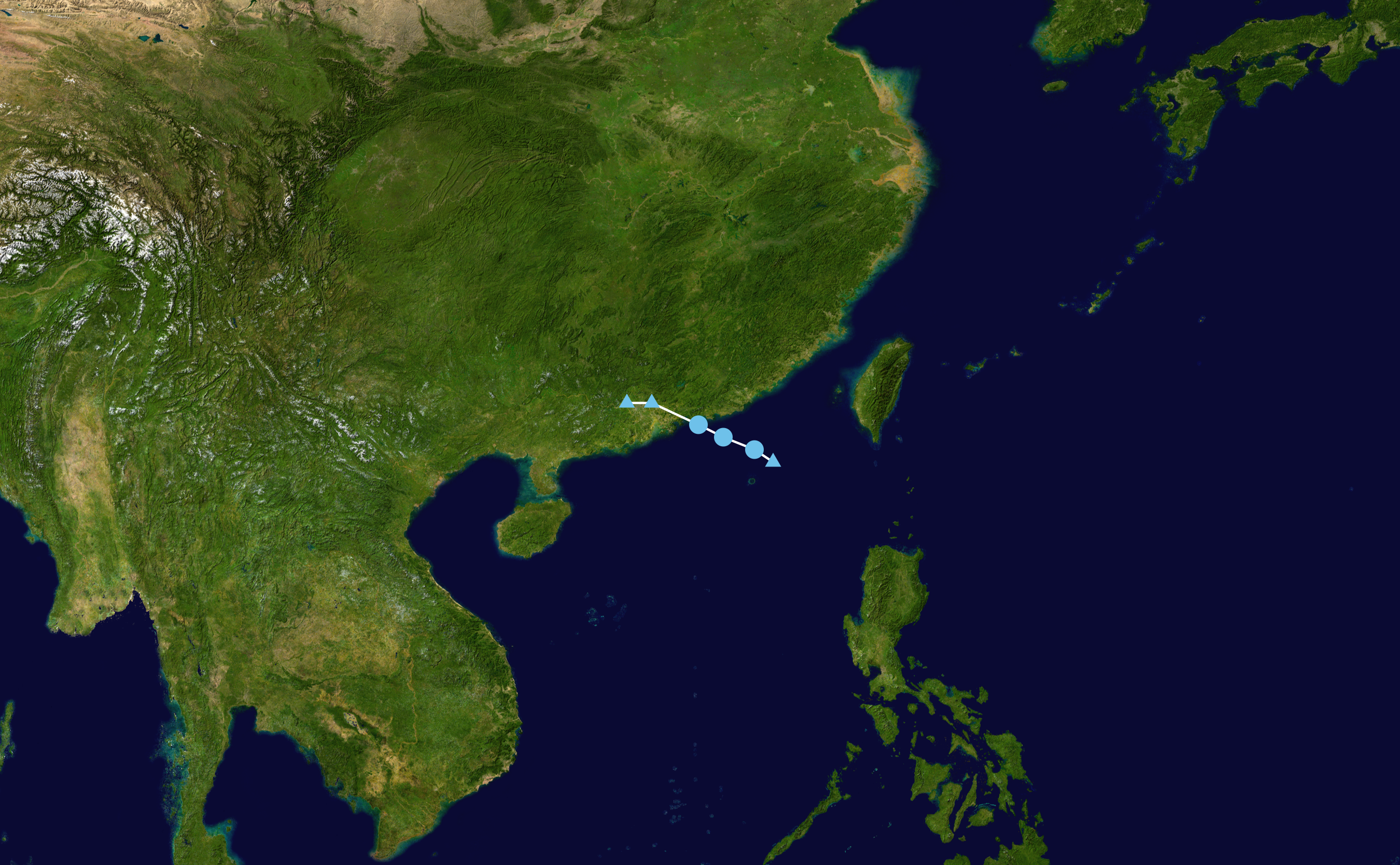
- Duration: August 3 – August 4
- Peak intensity: <55 km/h (35 mph) (10-min); 1002 hPa (mbar)

On August 2, the JTWC noted an area of disorganized convection in the South China Sea, approximately 105 nmi (194 km; 121 mi) to the south-southeast of Kaohsiung, Taiwan. Under a favorable environment of warm sea surface temperatures, low wind shear, and moderate equatorial outflow, the convection rapidly consolidated a low-level circulation center which led the JTWC to issue a Tropical Cyclone Formation Alert by the next day. The JMA then upgraded the system into a tropical depression by 18:00 UTC the same day. The JTWC subsequently followed suit, designating the depression as 08W by early August 4. The system then struck Huidong County, Guangdong at 01:40 UTC that same day, according to the China Meteorological Administration, prompting the JTWC to issue its final advisory eight hours after landfall.

=== Tropical Storm Mulan ===
- Tropical storm (JMA)
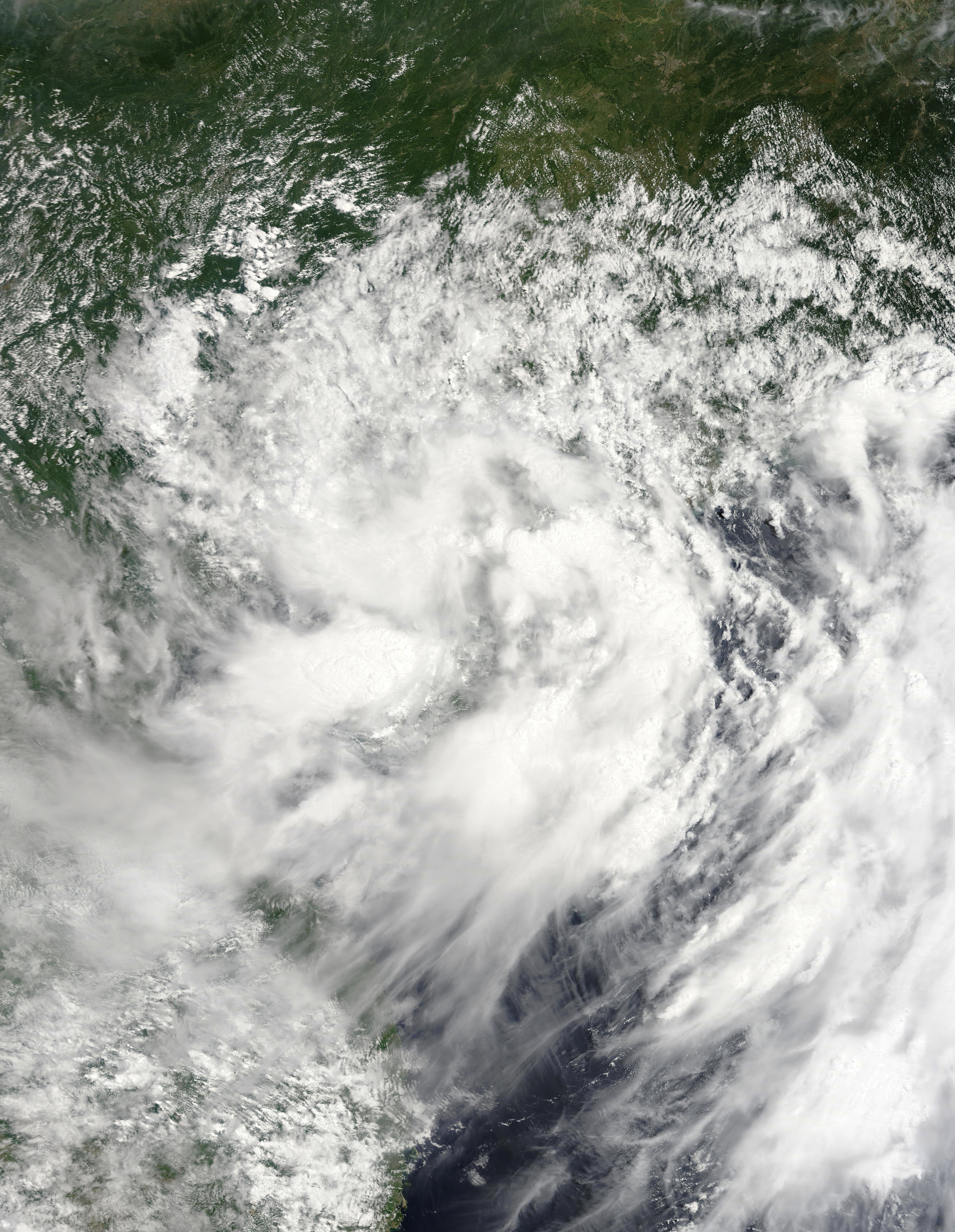
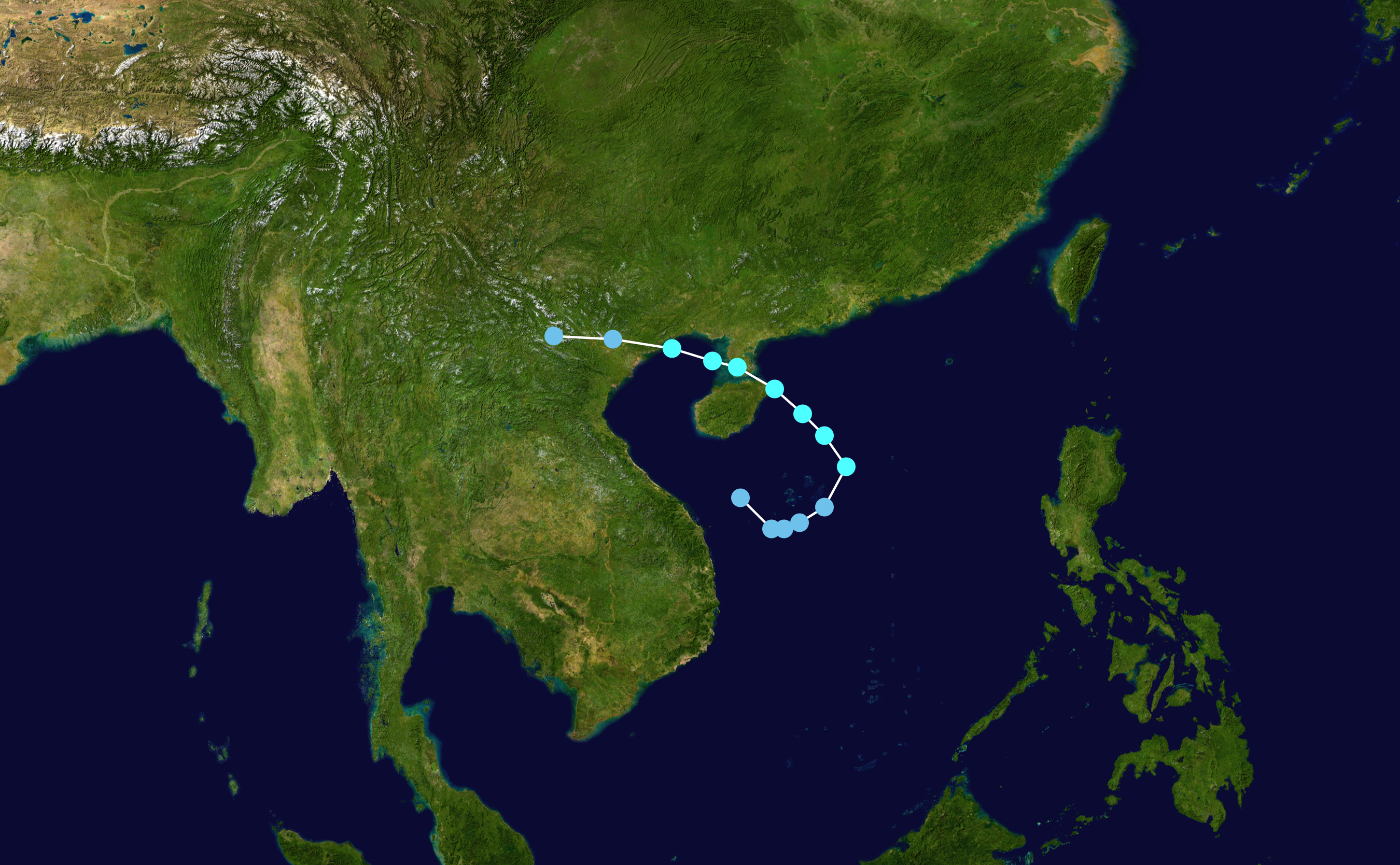
- Duration: August 8 – August 11
- Peak intensity: 65 km/h (40 mph) (10-min); 994 hPa (mbar)

On August 5, the JTWC noticed an area of convection with a consolidating low-level circulation center at approximately 7 nmi (13 km; 8.1 mi) to the south of Manila, Philippines. The system then subsequently moved over Luzon and emerged into the South China Sea, where it organized but its circulation remained broad, having two distinct vortices present in satellite imagery. The JMA then upgraded the system into a tropical depression by 00:00 UTC on August 8. The JTWC designated the system as a "monsoon depression" six hours later due to many centers present in the system, before issuing a TCFA as it was steadily organizing with its radius of maximum winds shrinking. By the next day, the JMA upgraded it into a tropical storm, and it was given the name Mulan. The JTWC, however, did not recognize Mulan as tropical, due to its huge radius of maximum winds which "are typically present in monsoonal depressions." The storm did not intensify further, according to the JMA, and by 02:50 UTC on August 10, Mulan made landfall on the coastal areas of Xuwen County in Zhanjiang, Guangdong. The JTWC subsequently canceled the TCFA and downgraded its formation chances to medium. The JMA then downgraded the storm into a tropical depression as it moved inland in Vietnam by the next day, and was last noted six hours later the same day.

Heavy rainfall in Vietnam caused flash flooding which resulted in the deaths of six people. The northern region of the country experienced torrential rainfall of about 20 to 50 mm (0.79 to 1.97 in). The storm also caused agricultural damages of an estimated ₫2.5 billion (US$107,000) after about 30,000 lobsters have died due to the effects of the storm. In Son La the damaged reached 7 billion dong (US$295,000), in Da Bac District is 2.3 billion dong (US$97,000) and in Cao Phong District in Hoa Binh is 3 billion dong (US$127,000). Total damages caused by Mulan were 33.7 billion VND (US$1.44 million).

=== Tropical Storm Meari ===
- Tropical storm (JMA)
- Tropical storm (SSHWS)
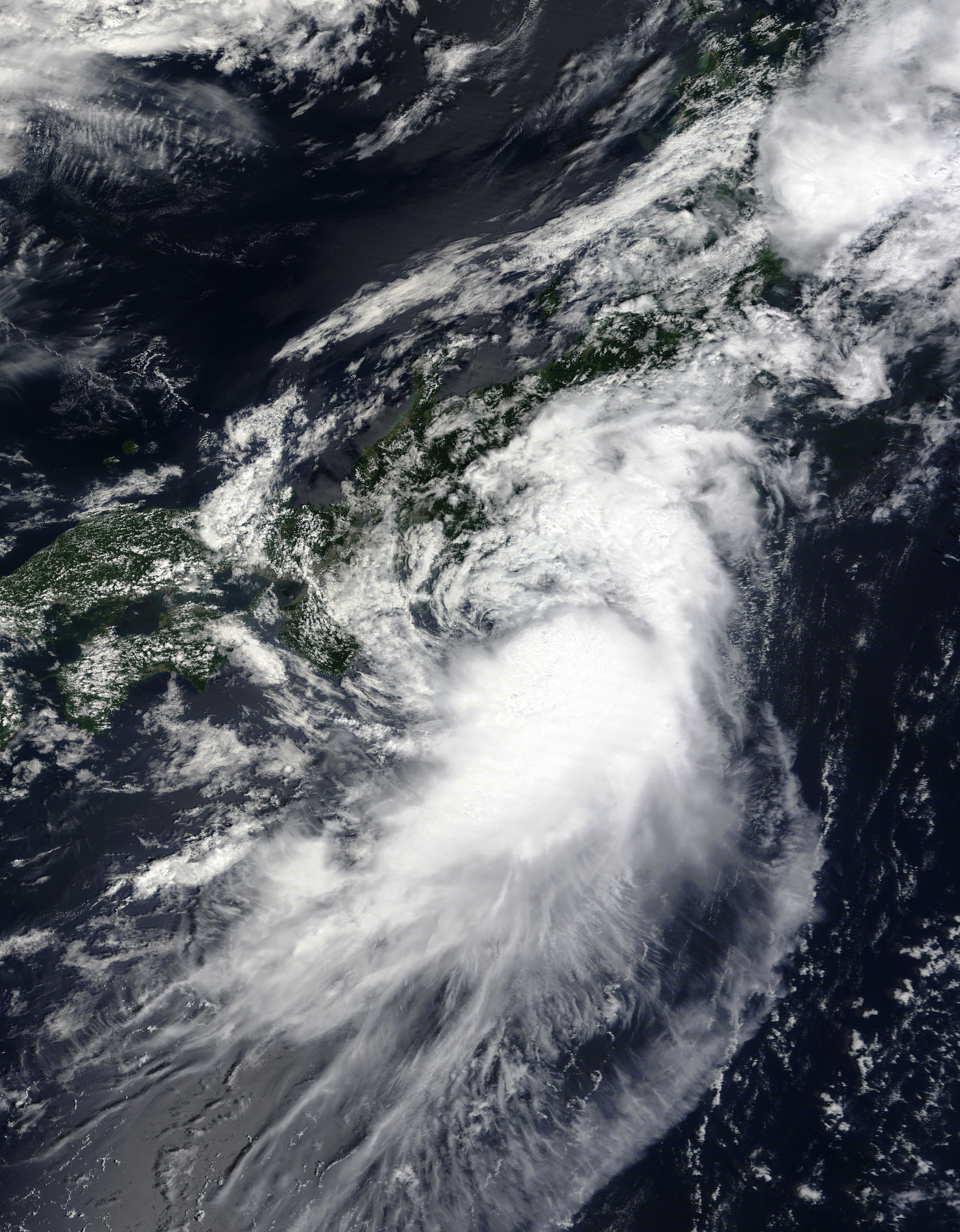
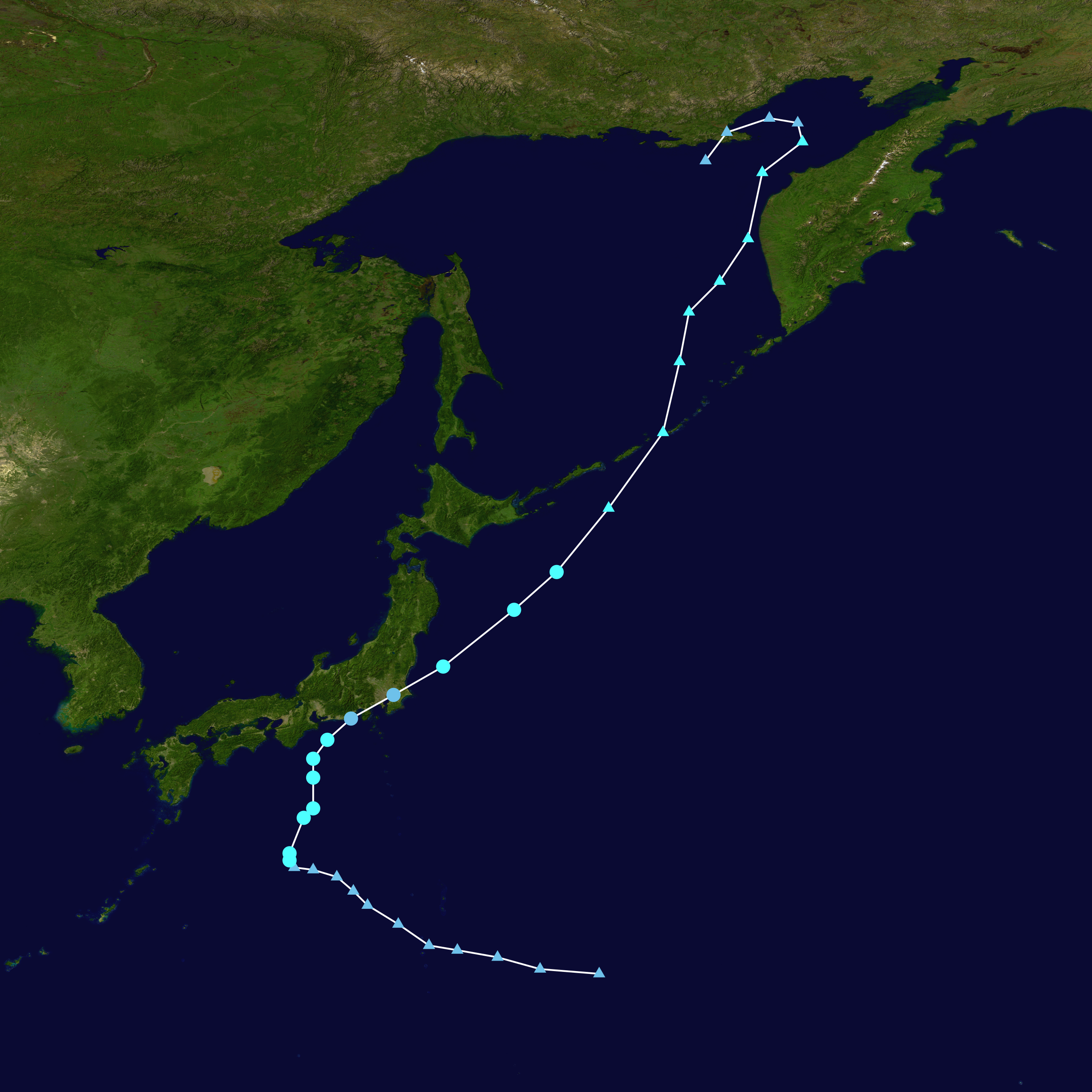
- Duration: August 8 – August 14
- Peak intensity: 75 km/h (45 mph) (10-min); 996 hPa (mbar)

A low-pressure area developed into a tropical depression northwest of Iwo Jima on August 10. After JMA named the system Meari, the JTWC followed suit in an unofficial bulletin, classifying this system as a tropical storm. However, according to the agency, because of colder waters, the storm returned to the Pacific Ocean after threatening the southern coast of Japan without causing major impacts.

In preparation for Meari, government officials in Tokyo warned of heavy rains and strong winds. The final day of the Rock in Japan Festival was cancelled and ticket refunds were distributed. Three J1 League games in Tokyo and Kanagawa Prefecture were also cancelled. About 72,000 residents were evacuated in Shizuoka; two landslides were reported which isolated five houses. Power outages affected 1,200 homes in Shimizu and another 2,200 were affected in Kakegawa. Parts of the Shin-Tōmei Expressway, connecting Tokyo to Nagoya, were closed as a result of heavy rains, while tunnel speed limits were lowered. Rainfall also affected flights and bullet train services, the latter of which affecting 92,000 people. An elderly man in Hamamatsu sustained forehead injuries after being knocked down by strong winds.

Homes in Central Japan were destroyed.

=== Severe Tropical Storm Ma-on (Florita) ===
- Severe tropical storm (JMA)
- Category 1 typhoon (SSHWS)
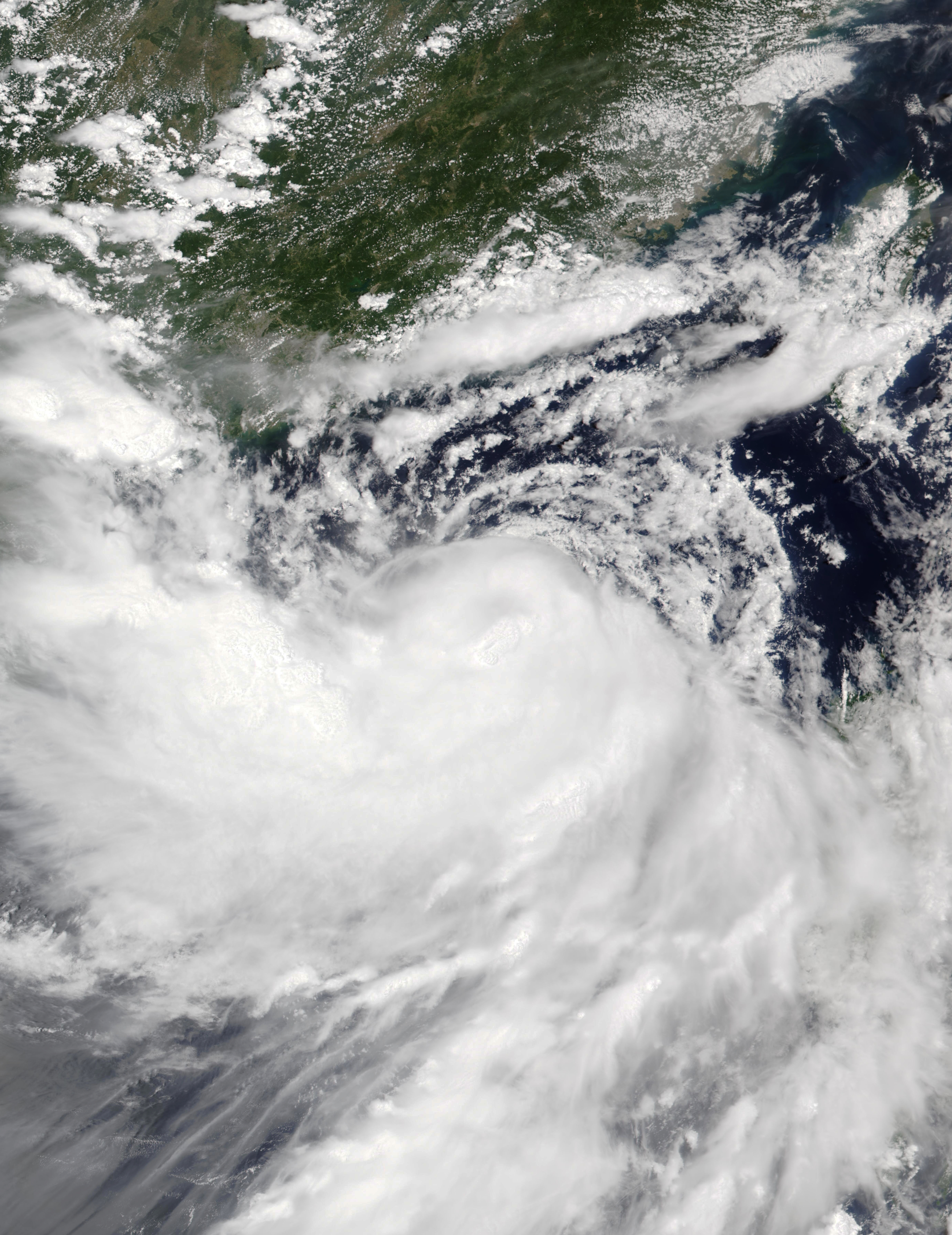
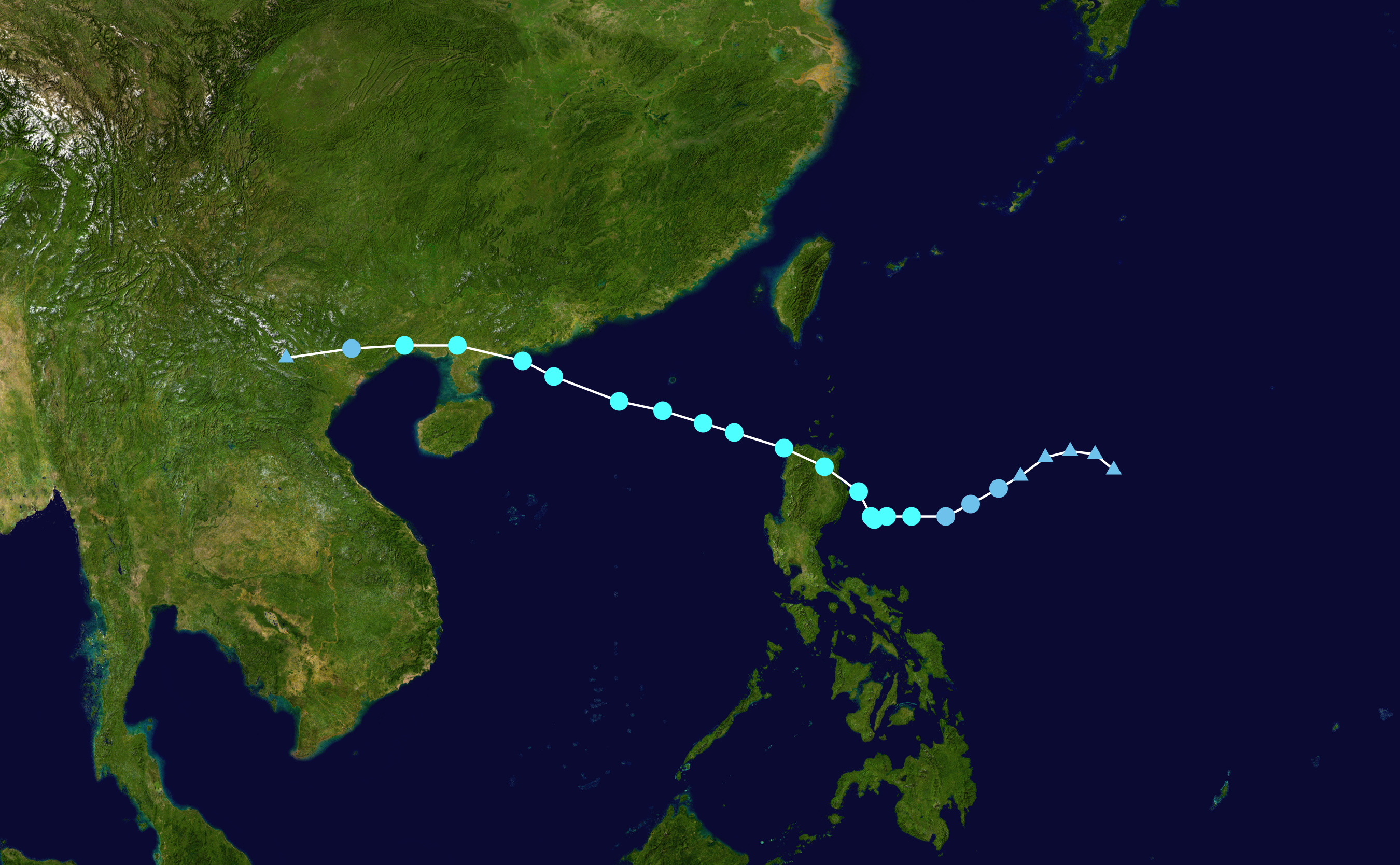
- Duration: August 20 – August 26
- Peak intensity: 100 km/h (65 mph) (10-min); 985 hPa (mbar)

On August 19, the JMA began tracking a low pressure area in the Philippine Sea, around 500 kilometres (310 mi) north of Palau. The low pressure area slowly moved westwards, eventually developing into a tropical depression on August 20. The following day, the PAGASA also announced the system's formation into a tropical depression, and as a result of its position within the PAR, assigned it the name Florita. Shortly afterwards, the JTWC designated the system as 10W. Florita remained relatively weak, having an exposed circulation. By August 22, it was upgraded to tropical storm, being designated Ma-on by the Japan Meteorological Agency, with the JTWC later following suit.

On the evening of August 22, the exposed low-level circulation center was obscured by a convection burst, which later turned into a central dense overcast, which prompted the JMA to upgrade Ma-on into a severe tropical storm. At 10 a.m. PHT, Ma-on made landfall at Maconacon, Isabela as a high-end severe tropical storm, just short of typhoon intensity, according to the PAGASA. Four fatalities occurred; infrastructure damage was estimated to be ₱571 million (US$10.4 million), while agricultural damage was estimated to be ₱1.86 billion (US$33.6 million).

On the morning of August 25, Ma-on made landfall in Guangdong, China. Shortly after, the system moved westward to the Gulf of Tonkin. Later, the storm made its final landfall in Móng Cái, Quảng Ninh Province in Vietnam.

The storm caused moderate damage in Vietnam and killed three people.

=== Typhoon Tokage ===
- Typhoon (JMA)
- Category 3 typhoon (SSHWS)
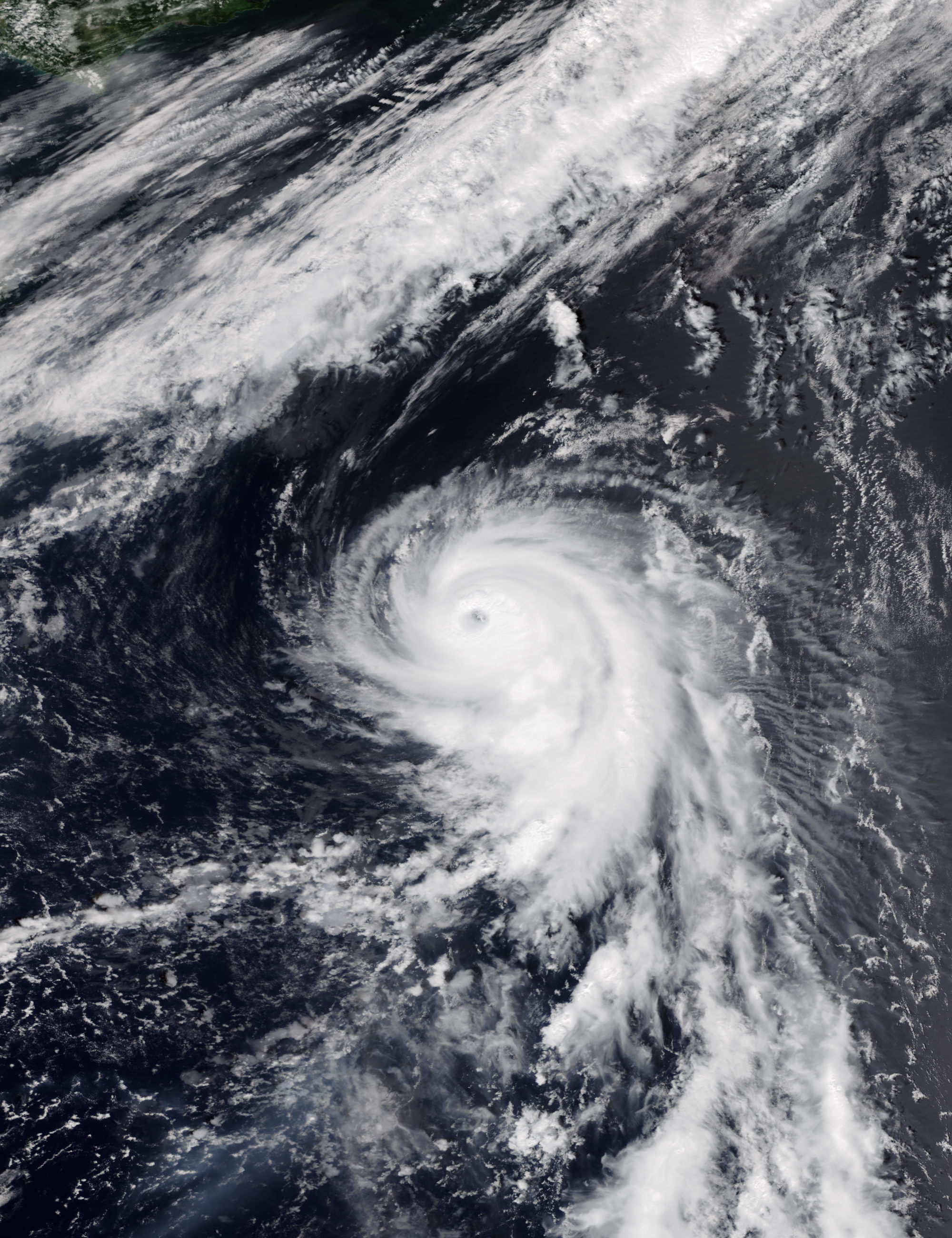
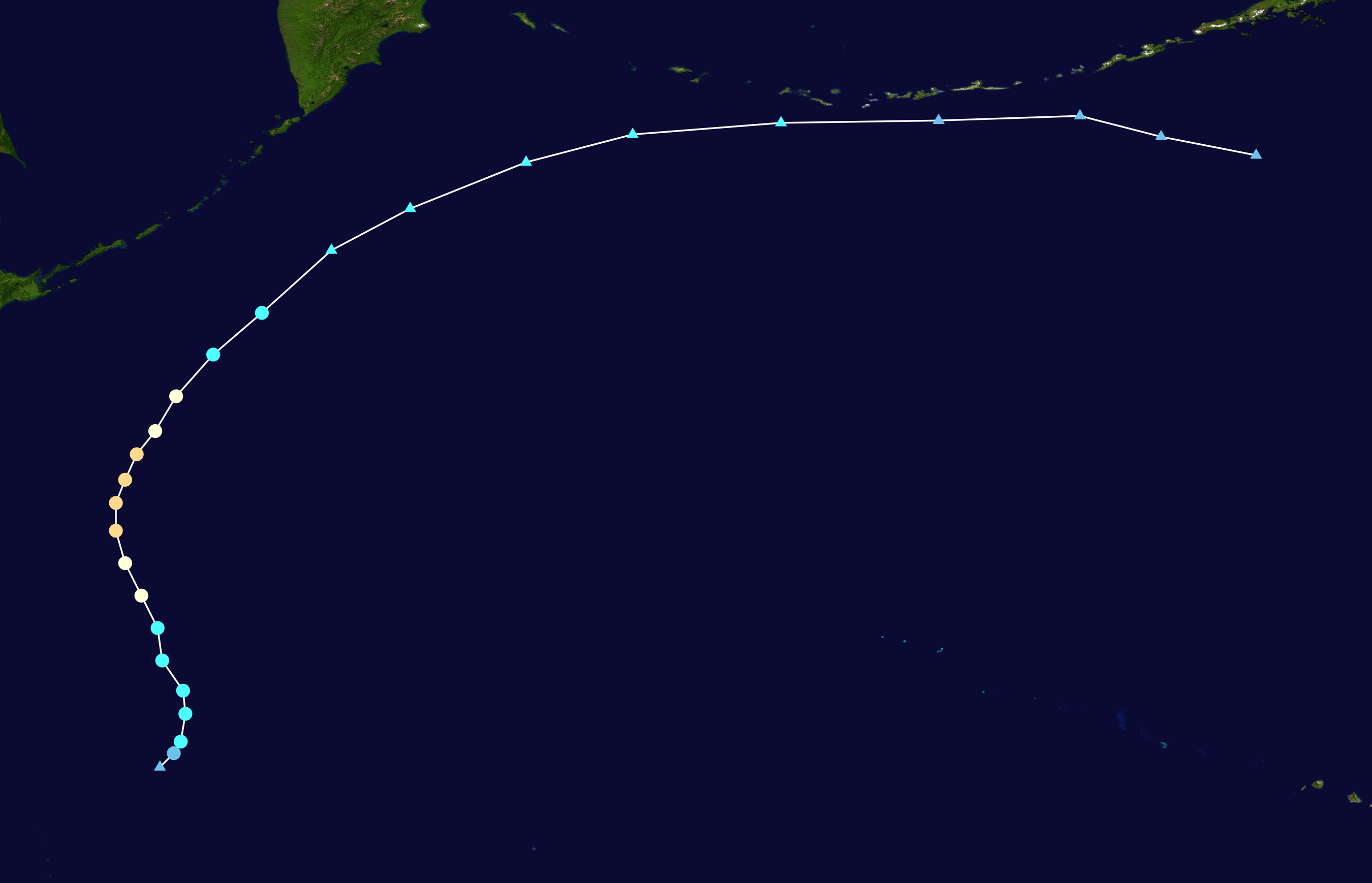
- Duration: August 21 – August 25
- Peak intensity: 140 km/h (85 mph) (10-min); 970 hPa (mbar)

On August 21, the JMA noted that a tropical depression had formed to the northeast of Guam. Under a favorable environment of warm sea surface temperatures, low wind shear, and very good poleward outflow, the system rapidly intensified to become Tropical Storm Tokage by early next day. Moving north-northwest, Tokage would intensify into a severe tropical storm later by the same day, and by 09:00 UTC on August 23, the JTWC upgraded Tokage to a typhoon, with the JMA following suit three hours later. The storm would peak six hours later according to the JMA, with 10-minute sustained winds of 140 km/h (87 mph) and a pressure of 970 hPa, while the JTWC estimated Tokage to have peaked at 00:00 UTC the next day, with 1-minute sustained winds of 175 km/h (109 mph), making Tokage a Category 3-equivalent typhoon on the Saffir-Simpson scale. After peaking, Tokage rapidly weakened under high wind shear as it curved northeastwards due to a deep-layered subtropical ridge positioned to the east of the storm, and commenced extratropical transition by 03:00 UTC on August 25. The storm would complete its transition 12 hours later, with the JTWC issuing its final advisory, and the JMA following suit three hours later.

=== Typhoon Hinnamnor (Henry) ===
- Violent typhoon (JMA)
- Category 5 super typhoon (SSHWS)
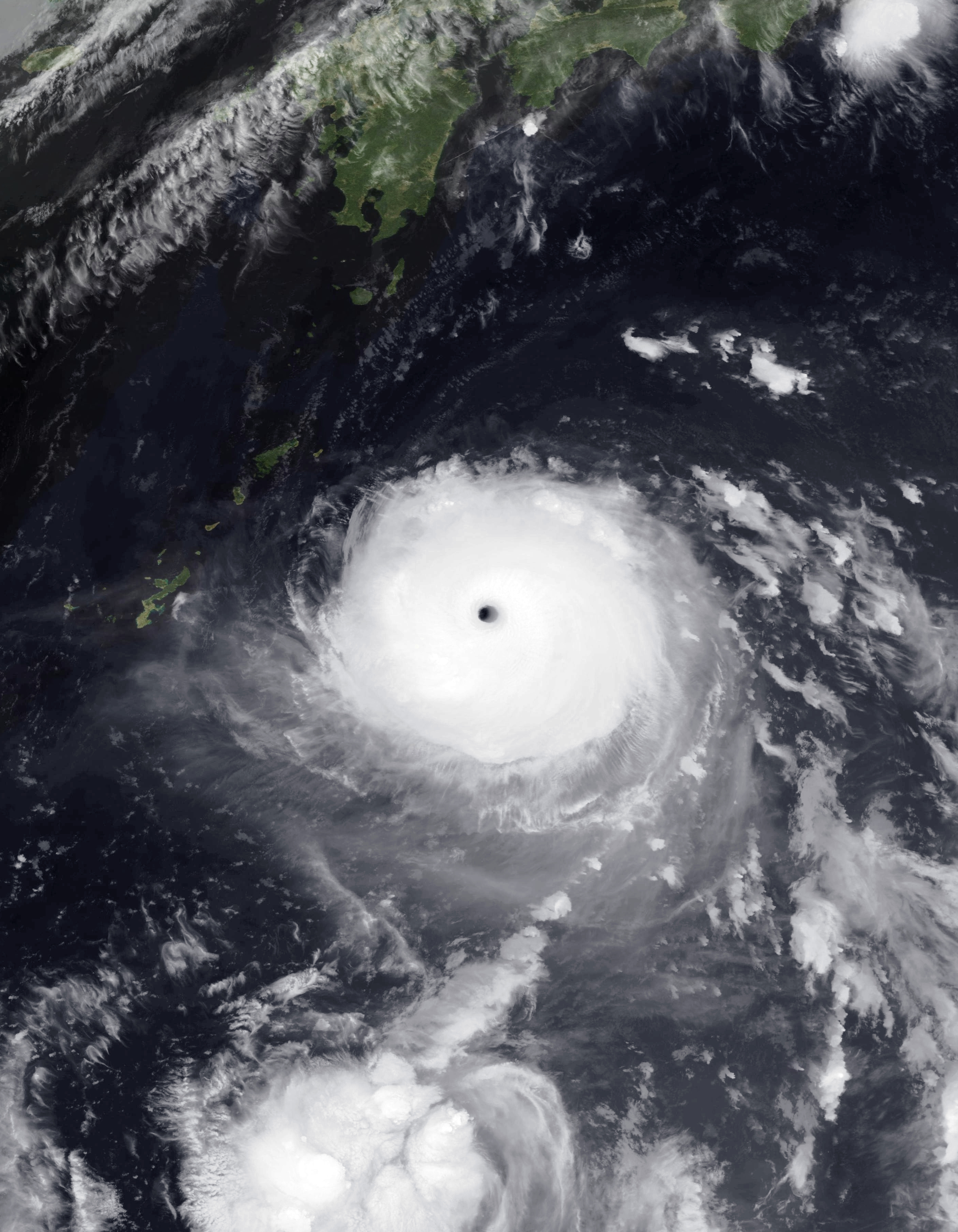
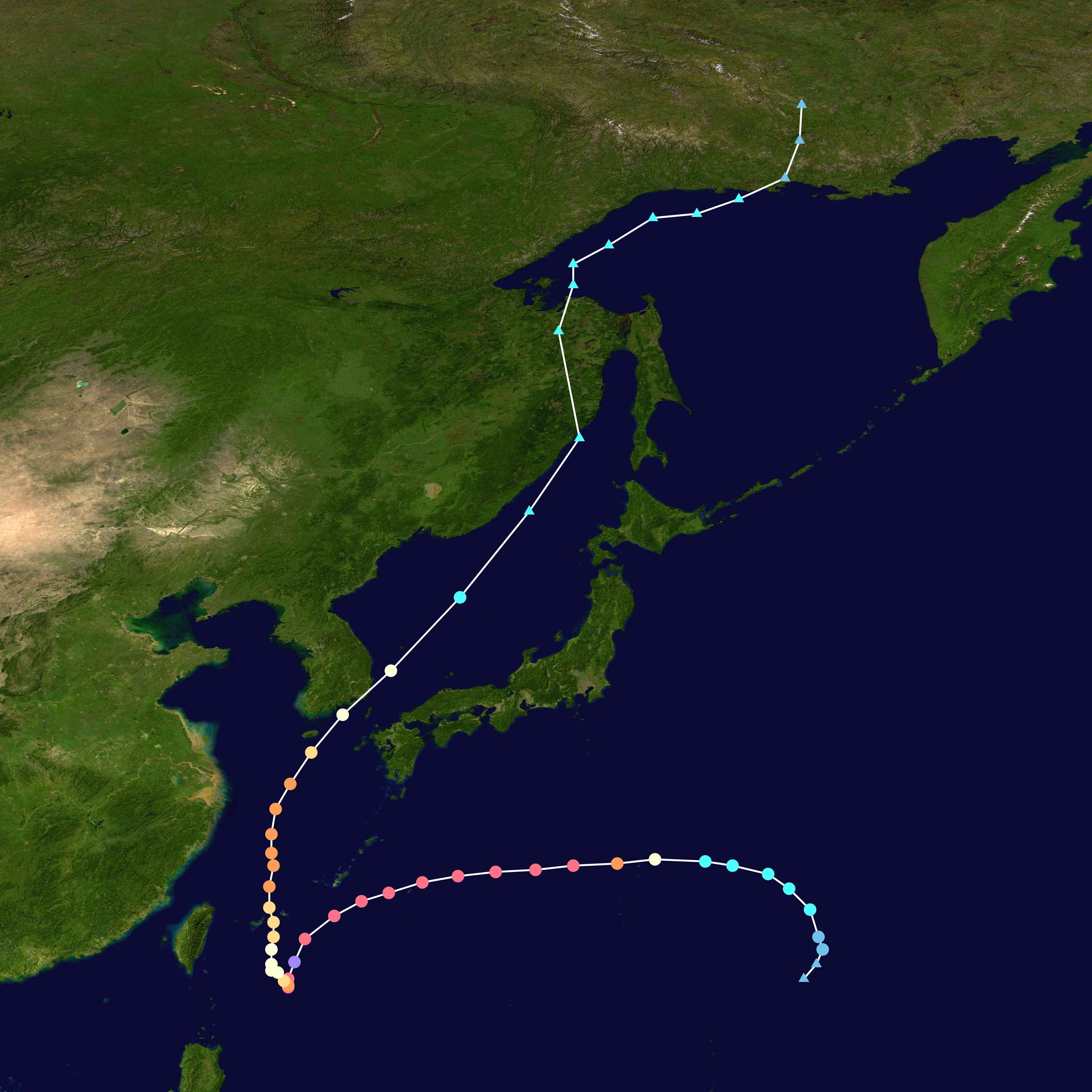
- Duration: August 27 – September 6
- Peak intensity: 195 km/h (120 mph) (10-min); 920 hPa (mbar)

On August 27, the JTWC began monitoring a disturbance located 461 nautical miles off Iwo Jima, which they labeled Invest 90W. Following organization, the agency issued a Tropical Cyclone Formation Alert (TCFA) at 04:10 UTC the next day. 6 hours later, it intensified into a tropical storm, being named Hinnamnor by the JMA, which replaced the name Nock-ten. Moving due west, Hinnamnor steadily strengthened, gaining Category 1-equivalent winds of 75 kn (139 km/h; 86 mph) on August 29. At the same time, the JMA upgraded Hinnamnor to a typhoon. The system underwent rapid intensification, and proceeded to gain Category 3-equivalent winds at 12:00 UTC the same day. Quickly strengthening overnight, the storm quickly grew with Category 5-equivalent winds of 140 kn (260 km/h; 160 mph), with a minimum pressure of 920 hectopascals (27.17 inHg) with a pinhole eye. Hinnamnor then weakened following an eyewall replacement cycle, slowing down as it neared Okinawa. As it stalled south of the Prefecture, the storm re-intensified, with an intense central dense overcast forming along with a larger eye. On August 31, at 5:30 p.m. PHT (09:30 UTC), Hinnamnor entered the PAGASA's Philippine Area of Responsibility and was named Henry. Hinnamnor later weakened into a Category-1 typhoon as it turns back north-northwest in the East China Sea. The system later re-strengthen into Category-3 typhoon, with deep convection becoming more symmetric on September 4. It later weakened back into Category-2 and made landfall over Geoje, South Gyeongsang Province, South Korea. The JMA issued its last advisory on Hinnamnor, and declared it an extratropical low. The low moved northward and last noted in Okhotsk, Russia on September 7.

In Ifugao, a man was buried in the landslide due to heavy rains caused by the typhoon. Several flights were canceled to and from Okinawa. When the typhoon made landfall in South Korea, it brought severe impacts. 60,000 homes were left without electricity and an elderly woman died due to currents. Another 9 people are missing. In the city of Pohang, South Korea, seven people were killed in the flooding of an underground parking garage. Hinnamnor caused >$1 billion in damages.

=== Typhoon Muifa (Inday) ===
- Very strong typhoon (JMA)
- Category 3 typhoon (SSHWS)
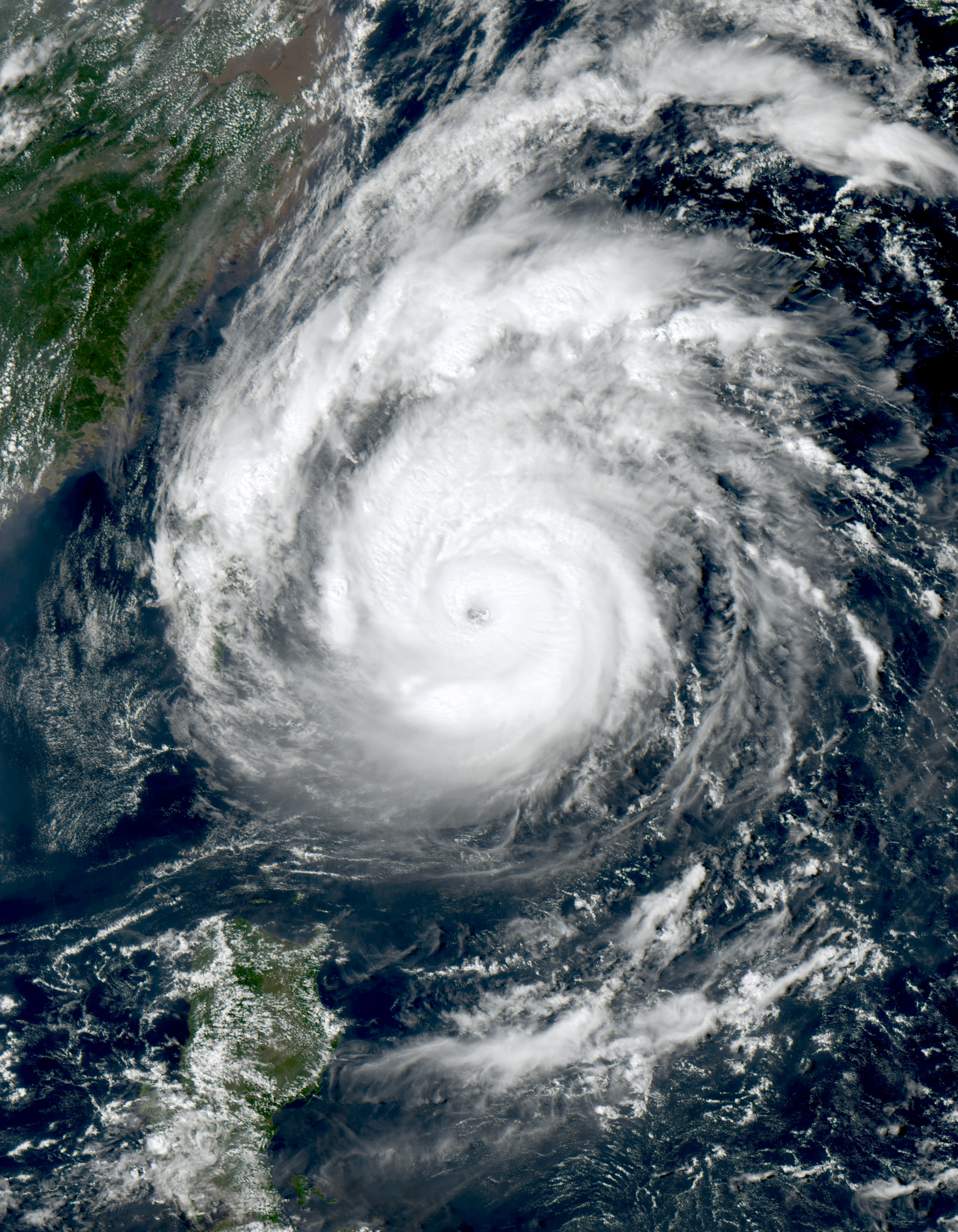
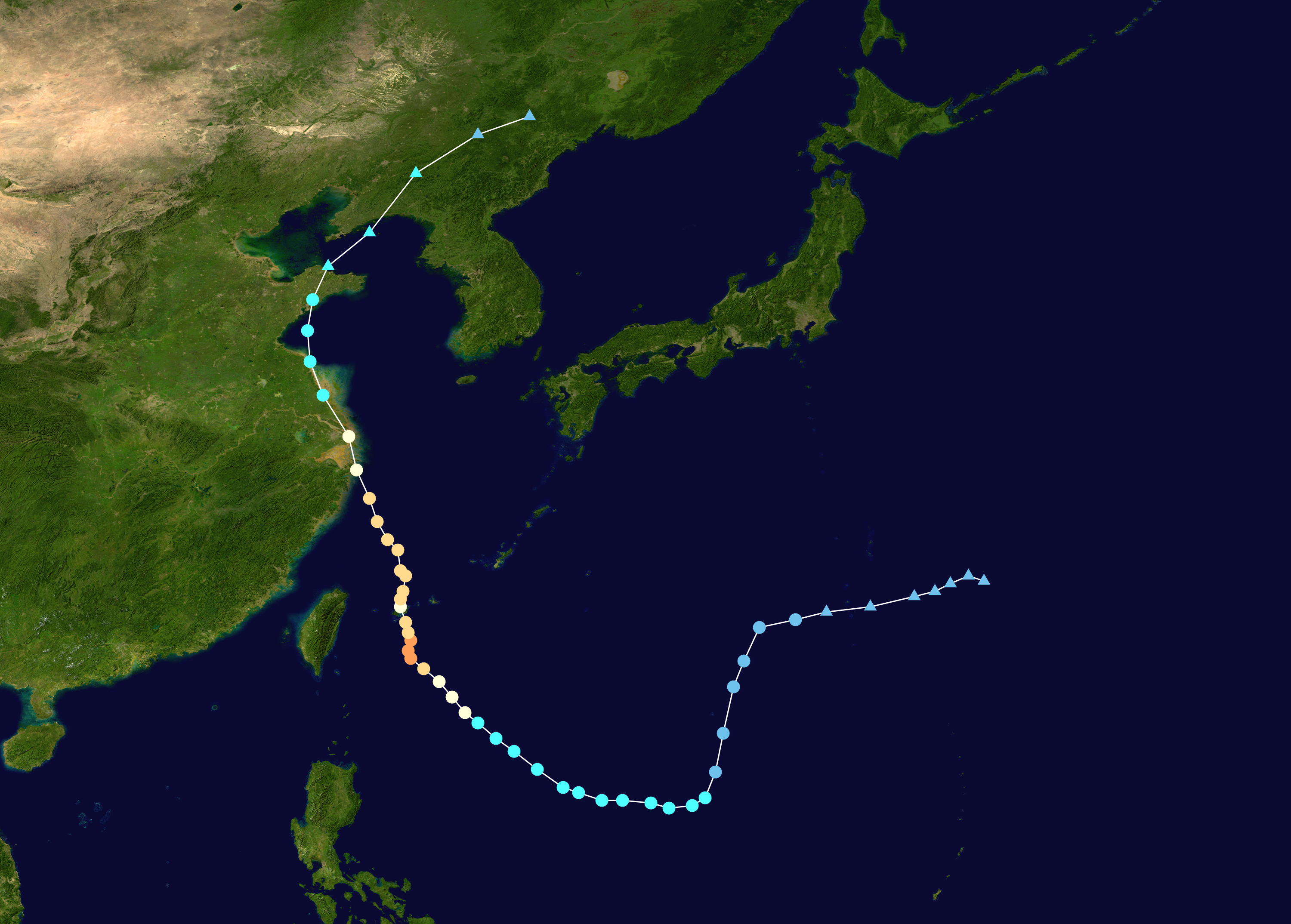
- Duration: September 3 – September 15
- Peak intensity: 155 km/h (100 mph) (10-min); 950 hPa (mbar)

The JTWC detected a disturbance at approximately 255 nmi (472 km; 293 mi) from Iwo-To. According to the agency, the cyclone achieved a favorable environment for a more comprehensive intensification because of the warm waters (between 30 and 31 °C [86 and 88 °F]) and was designated as Invest 91W. A day later, the cyclone became a tropical storm according to the JTWC, being 696 nmi (1,289 km; 801 mi) SSE of Kadena Air Base. The JMA, however, had not released any bulletin to designate this system until then. When the storm entered PAGASA's area of responsibility, it was named Inday; in its first bulletin, the agency stated that the storm was unlikely to impact the Philippines. Within the PAR, the storm strengthened into a severe tropical storm according to PAGASA. Muifa then intensified into a typhoon according to the JTWC, as it reached 120 km/h (75 mph; 65 kn) in sustained one-minute winds. Muifa continued intensifying, with the JTWC then assessing that Muifa reached Category 3-equivalent status on September 10. Then strengthening a bit more to a Category 4-equivalent typhoon. On September 12, Muifa hit Ishigaki Island; it left the PAR the same day in the afternoon. With winds of 155 km/h (96 mph; 84 kn), the typhoon made landfall in Zhoushan around 20:30 local time, making a second landfall shortly after in Shanghai. It is the most powerful typhoon to strike Shanghai on record. Muifa was downgraded to a tropical storm when it made landfall according to the JTWC. Muifa was downgraded to a tropical depression again by the JTWC on its last bulletin for the system.

On September 13, China issued an orange alert (Signal #2) on Muifa, warning that it could impact the Taiwan Strait, in addition to the provinces of Jiangsu, northern Zhejiang, and Shanghai. Several flights departing from the airports in Zhoushan, Ningbo and Shanghai were suspended due to Muifa. Activities in the Port of Shanghai were also suspended.

=== Typhoon Merbok ===
- Typhoon (JMA)
- Category 1 typhoon (SSHWS)
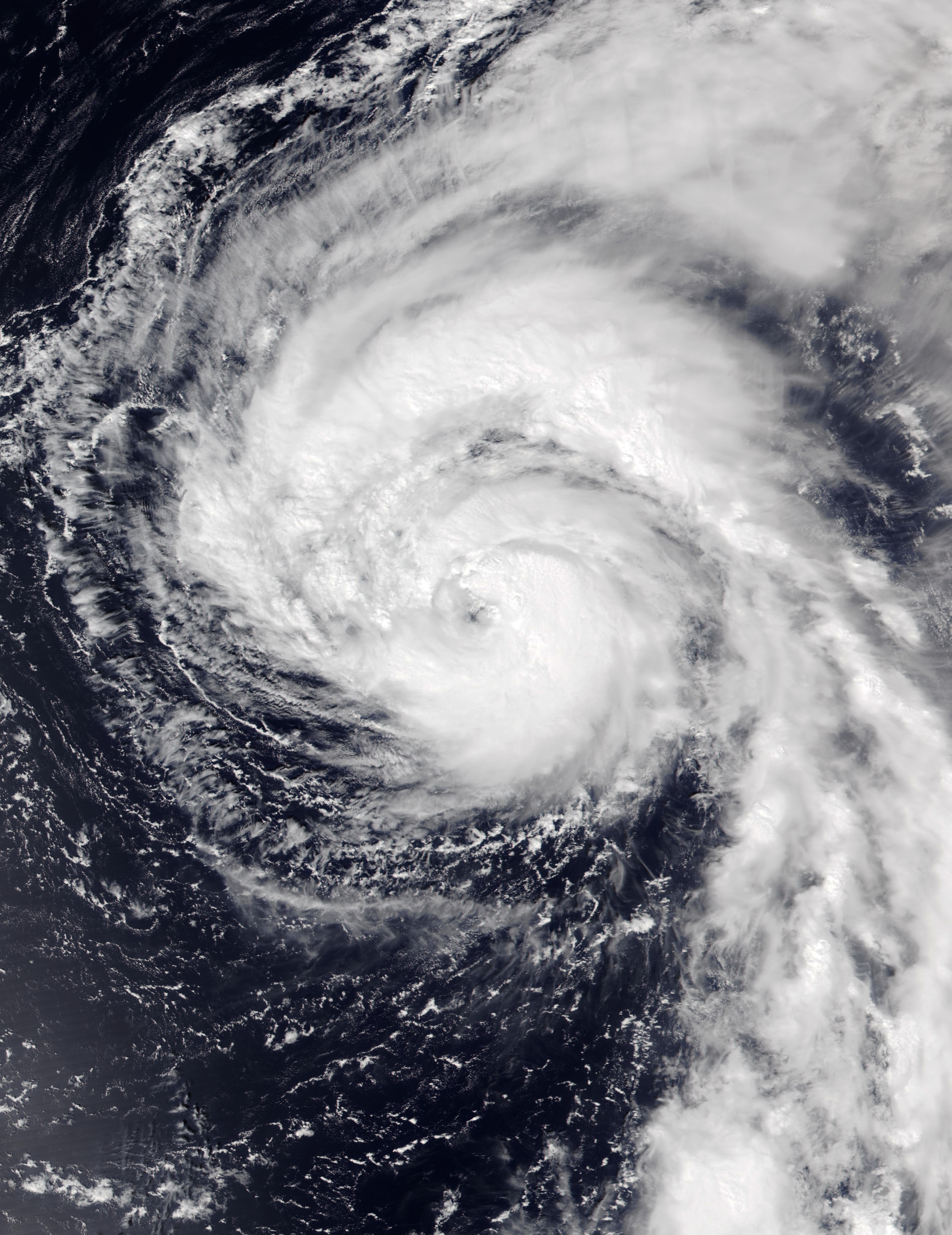
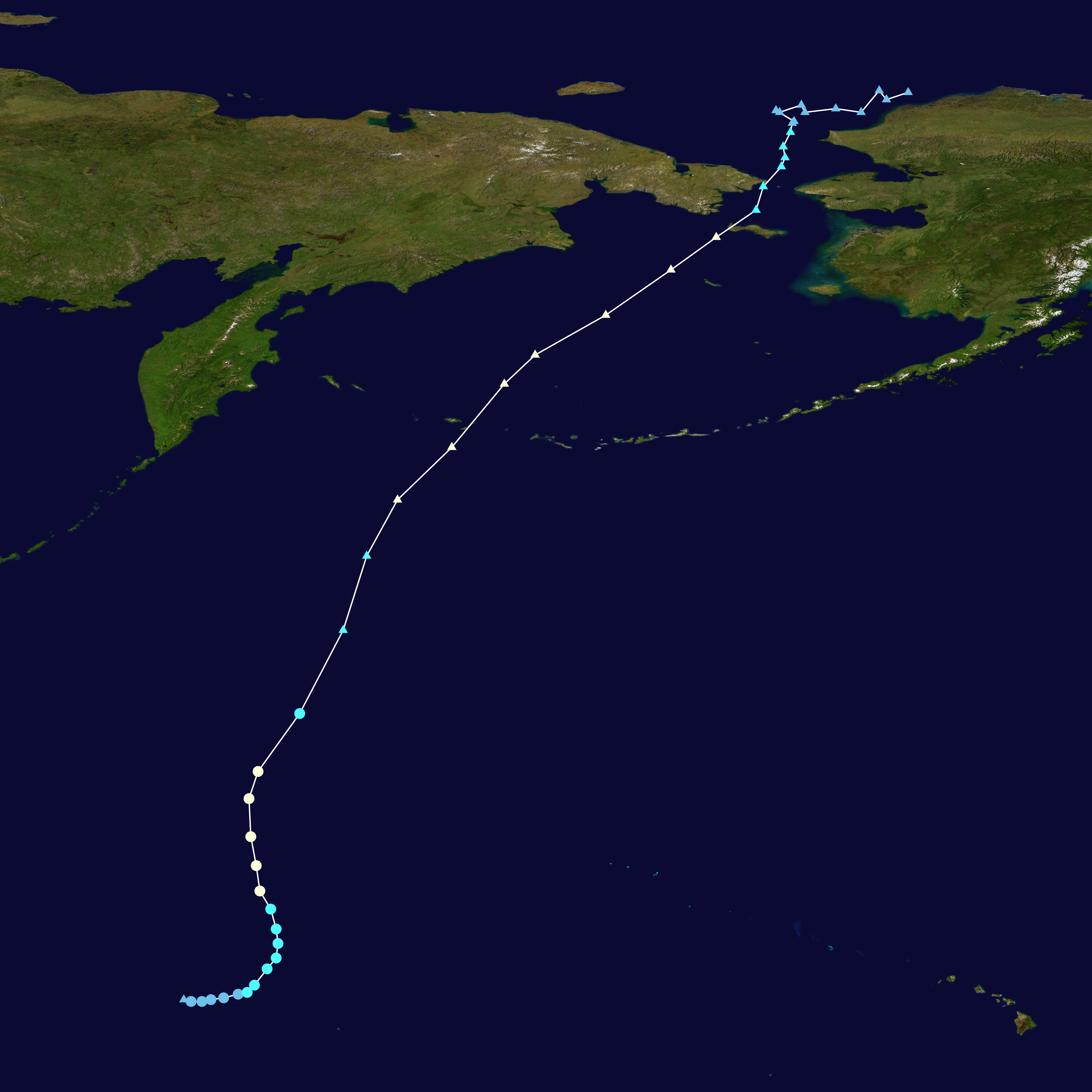
- Duration: September 10 – September 15
- Peak intensity: 130 km/h (80 mph) (10-min); 965 hPa (mbar)

On September 9, the JMA designated a weak tropical depression west of Wake Island. On the next day, the JTWC classified the system as 15W. The depression strengthened into Tropical Storm Merbok on September 12, becoming a typhoon a day later. On September 15, the JTWC gave its final bulletin on Merbok, noting that it had moved away from habitable areas. After transitioning into an extratropical cyclone, the system tracked generally northeastward and continued to deepen as it encountered record warm waters near the western Aleutian Islands. Water levels in Unalakleet peaked at around 12.5 ft (3.8 m), which was among its largest peaks on record. Significant flooding and gale force winds were widely reported across the west coast of Alaska.

=== Typhoon Nanmadol (Josie) ===
- Violent typhoon (JMA)
- Category 4 super typhoon (SSHWS)
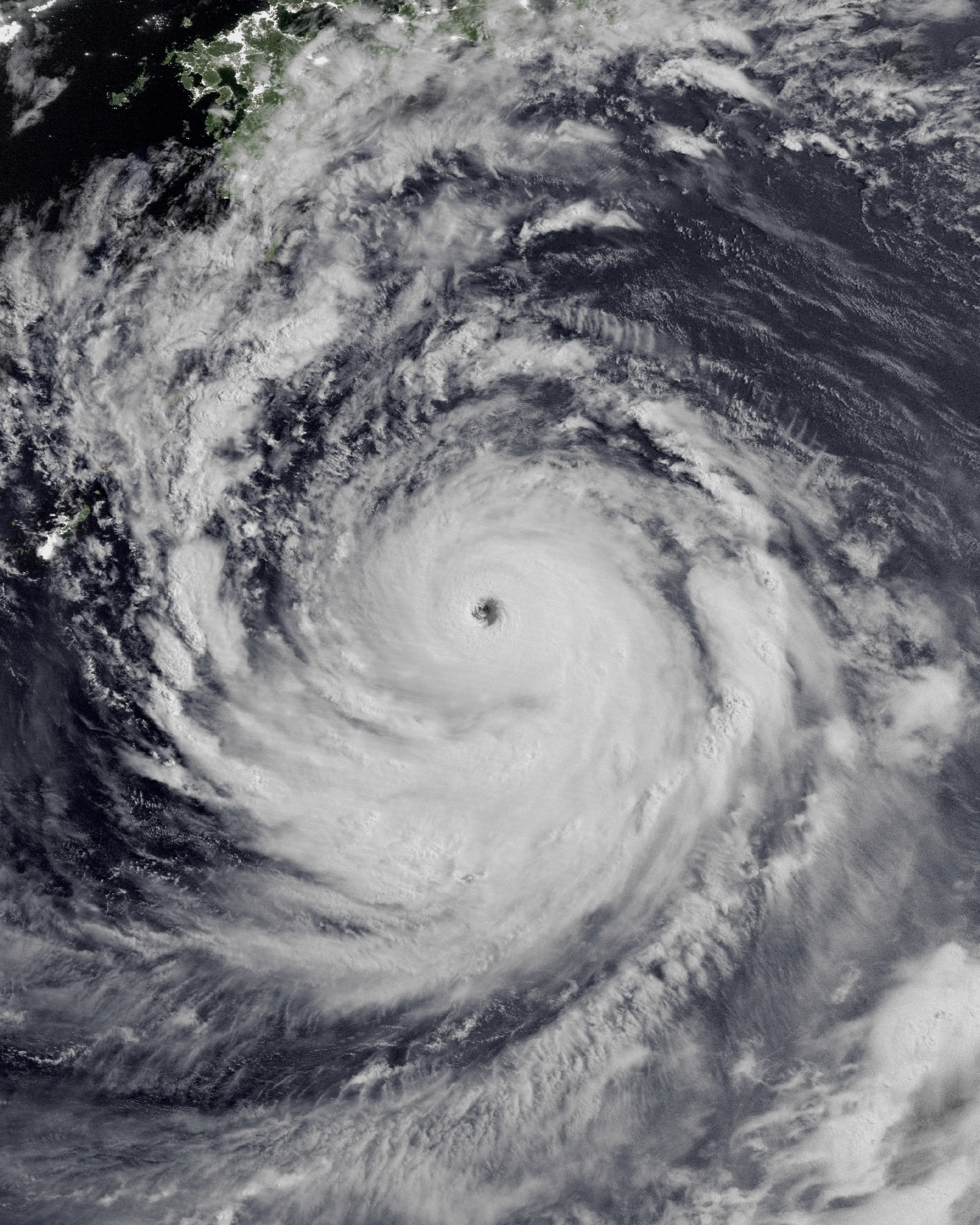
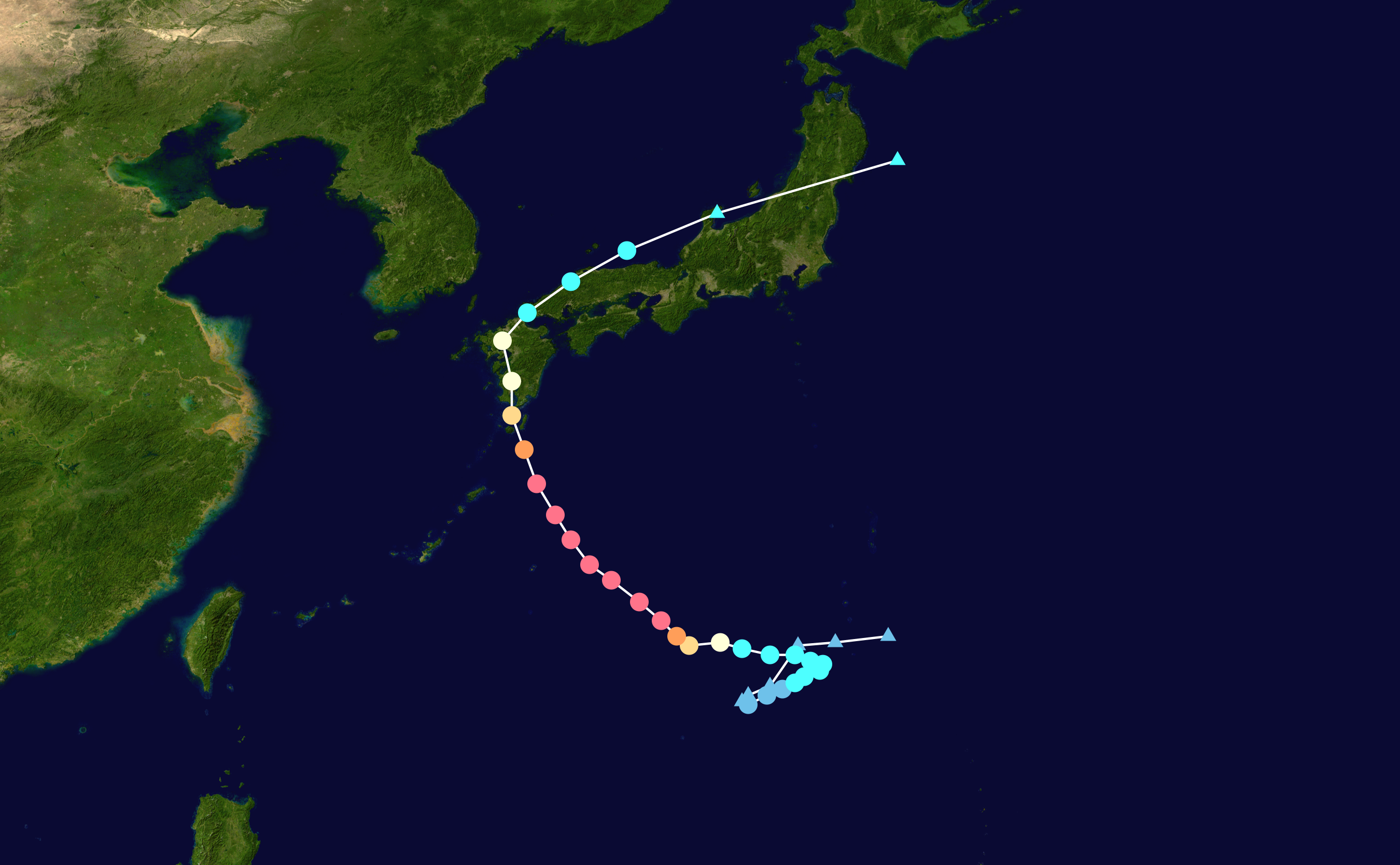
- Duration: September 12 – September 19
- Peak intensity: 195 km/h (120 mph) (10-min); 910 hPa (mbar)

On 06:00 UTC of September 9, the JMA briefly tracked a weak tropical depression to the east of Iwo To, Japan. The JMA re-upgraded the system to a tropical depression two days later. On September 12, the JTWC designated the system 16W and it was located approximately 262 nmi (485 km; 302 mi) southwest of Iwo-To. On the same day, the JMA and the JTWC upgraded the system to a tropical storm, with the JMA assigning it the name Nanmadol. The storm then reached typhoon status on September 15. Nanmadol rapidly intensified into a very strong typhoon, according to the JTWC's thirteenth bulletin. Nanmadol then entered the PAGASA's Philippine Area of Responsibility at 09:40 UTC on September 16, and was given the name Josie, however, it quickly left the PAR, just over four hours later, at 14:00 UTC on the same day. A system pressure of 910 hPa (mbar) was then recorded, the lowest so far this season. When it made landfall in southern Japan, the typhoon was downgraded to Category 3-equivalent status upon reaching Kyushu Islands. Upon directly impacting the country, it was downgraded again to Category 1-equivalent status. On its way to northeast Japan post-landfall, the cyclone was downgraded to a tropical storm by the JTWC. The JMA also followed suit and downgraded it to a severe tropical storm. In its twenty-ninth bulletin, the JTWC reported that Nanmadol was weakening as it moved over land in Japan and would be downgraded to an extratropical cyclone.

Before the cyclone hit the country, the JMA issued a special warning that Nanmadol could cause severe damage, and at least 4 million people have been advised to leave their homes. Exceptionally high volumes of precipitation were recorded and resulted in flooding in streets, destruction of building walls. and destroyed power poles. At least 2 people died and another 70 people were injured. More than 200,000 people were left without electricity. In South Korea, the winds and rain caused by the typhoon also caused inconvenience. One person was injured, more than 700 people were evacuated from their homes, fallen trees were reported, and some locations in the southeast portion of the country were left without electricity.

=== Tropical Storm Talas ===
- Tropical storm (JMA)
- Tropical storm (SSHWS)
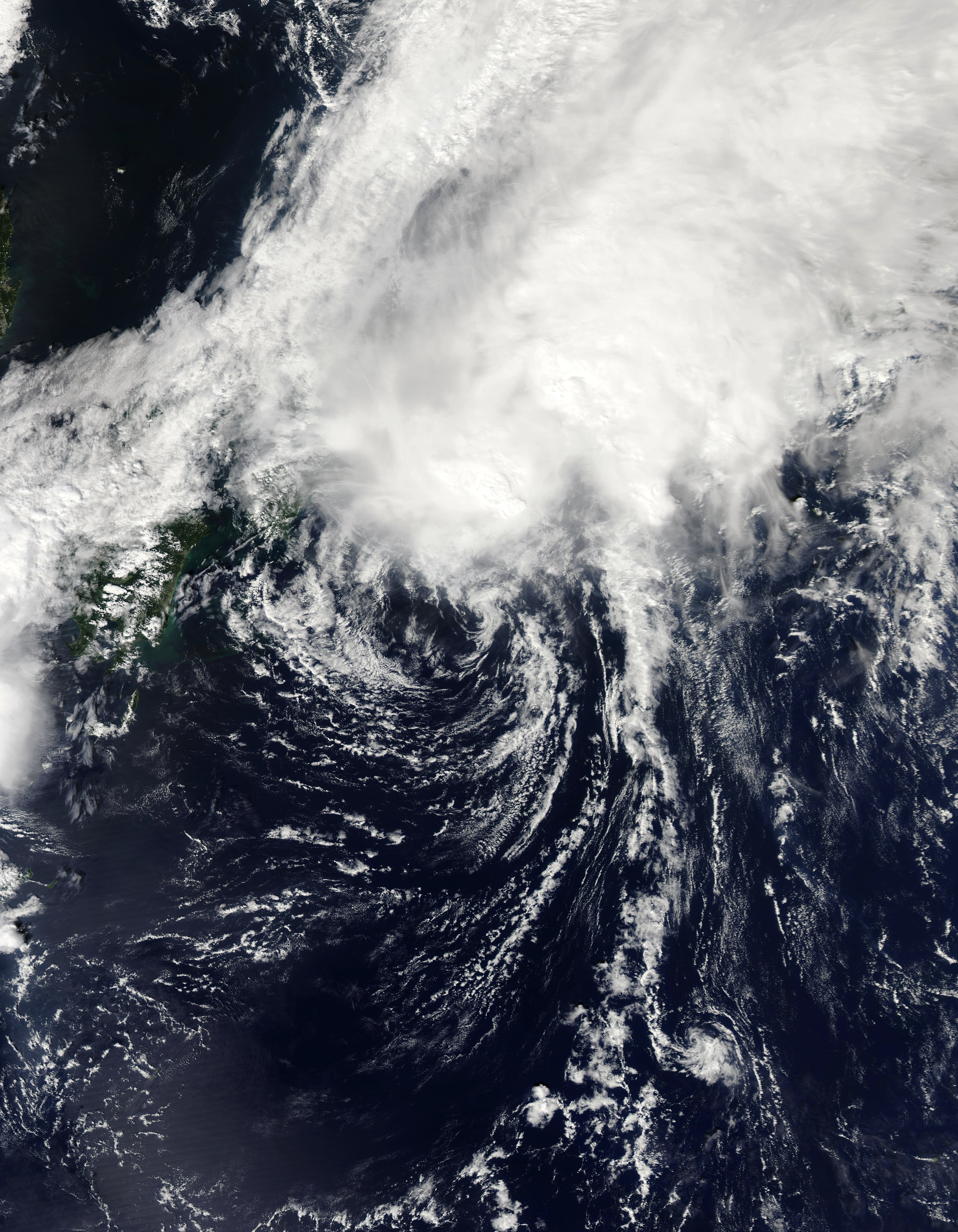
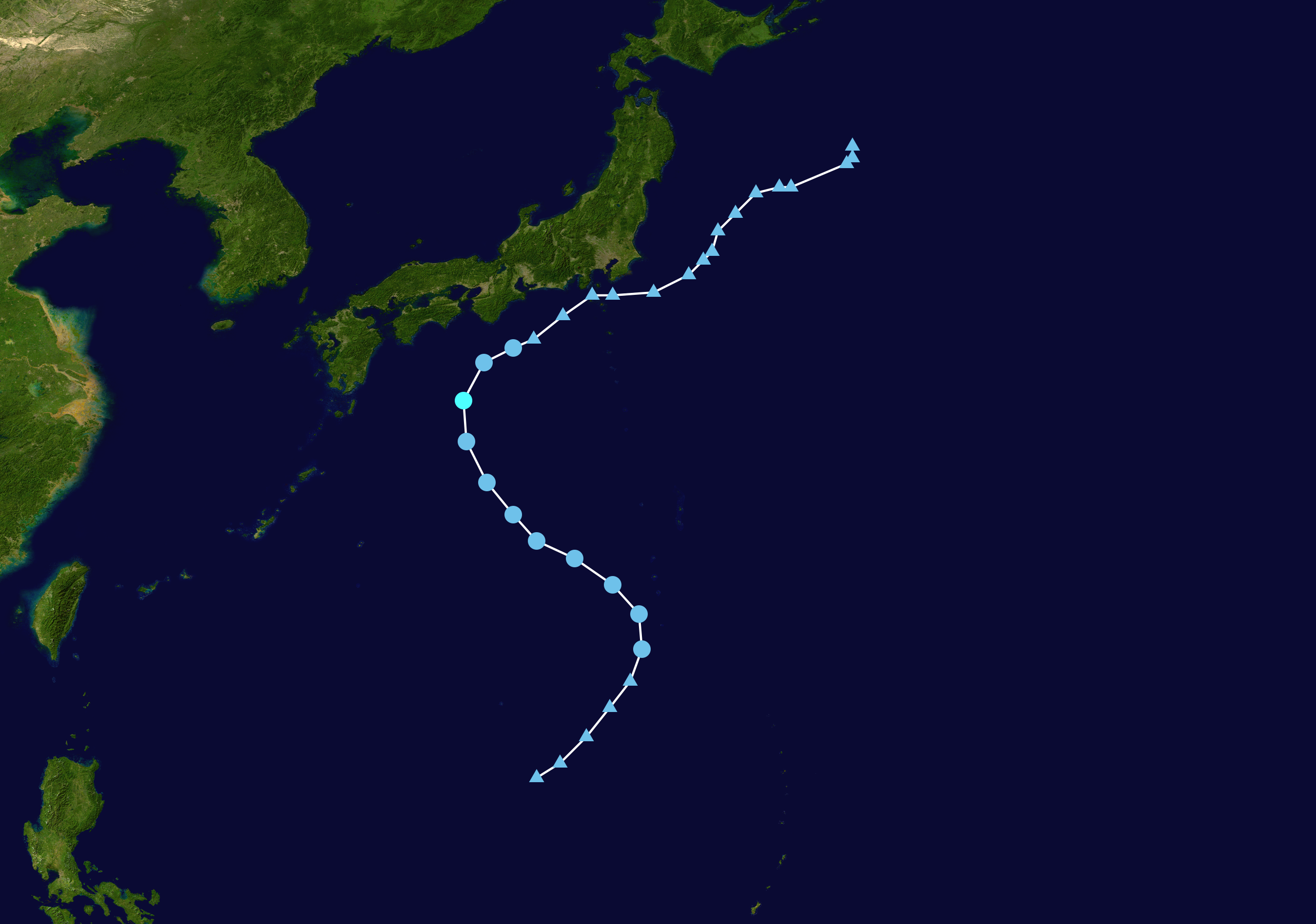
- Duration: September 20 – September 23
- Peak intensity: 65 km/h (40 mph) (10-min); 1000 hPa (mbar)

On September 20, a disturbance turned into a tropical depression according to the JMA. The JTWC reported that the low pressure encountered favorable environments for intensification by warm waters and low wind shear. The next day, the JTWC designated the system as 17W as it was upgraded into a tropical depression. On September 23, the cyclone was upgraded to a tropical storm according to the JTWC's sixth bulletin. The storm was named Talas by the JMA. When it made landfall in southern Japan, it was downgraded to a tropical depression according to the seventh JTWC bulletin.

A 10–12 cm (3.9–4.7 in) total hourly, total 30–42 cm (12–17 in) in twelve hours precipitation hit in Hamamatsu, Shizuoka City and other areas of Shizuoka Prefecture. A landslide hit Ōigawa Railway in Kawane, two transmission towers collapsed in Aoi-ku, Shizuoka, and 119,200 customers were affected by power outages in Shizuoka Prefecture, according to Heita Kawakatsu, Governor of Shizuoka. According to the Japan Fire and Disaster Management Agency official report, Talas killed three people and injured six others.

=== Typhoon Noru (Karding) ===
- Very strong typhoon (JMA)
- Category 5 super typhoon (SSHWS)
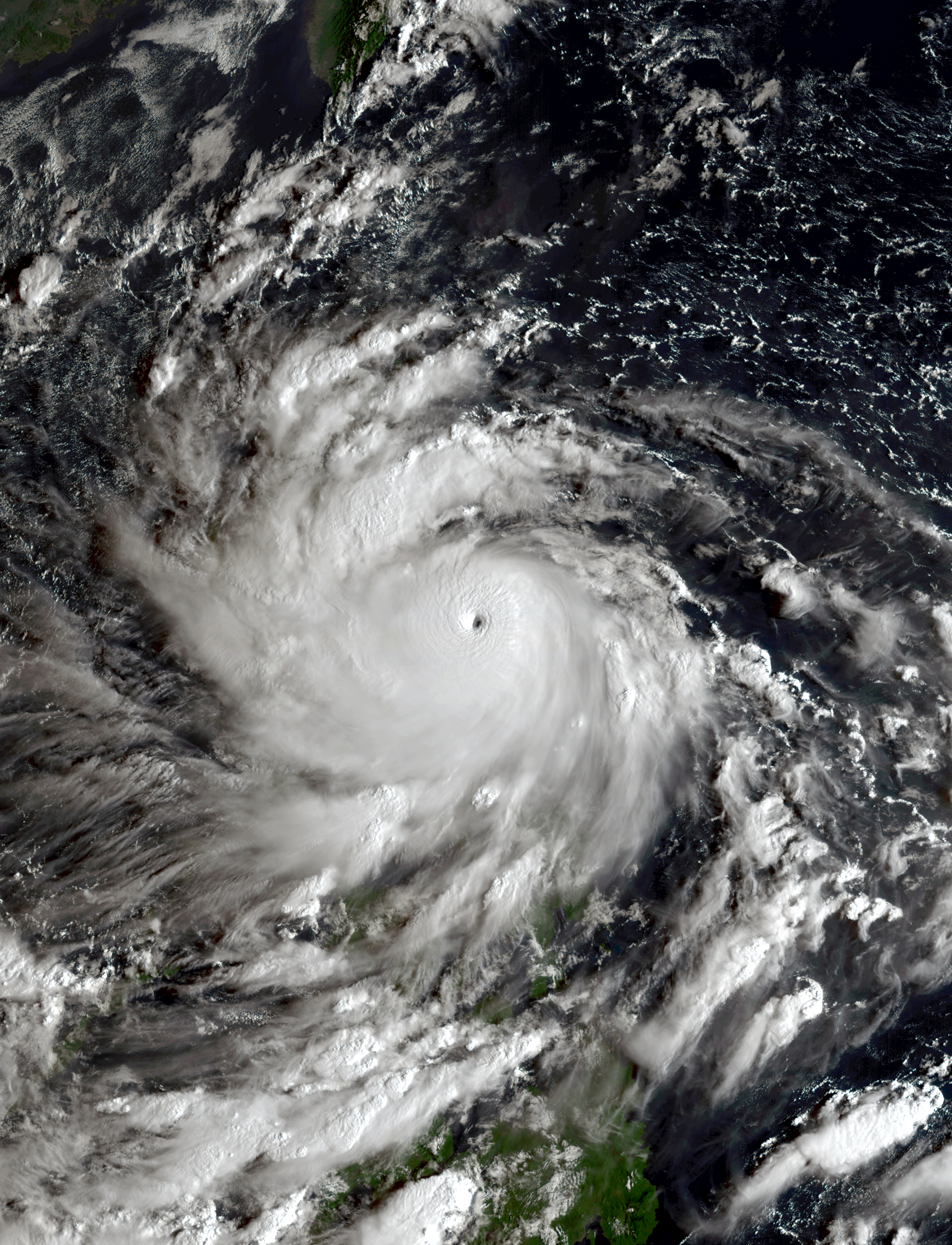
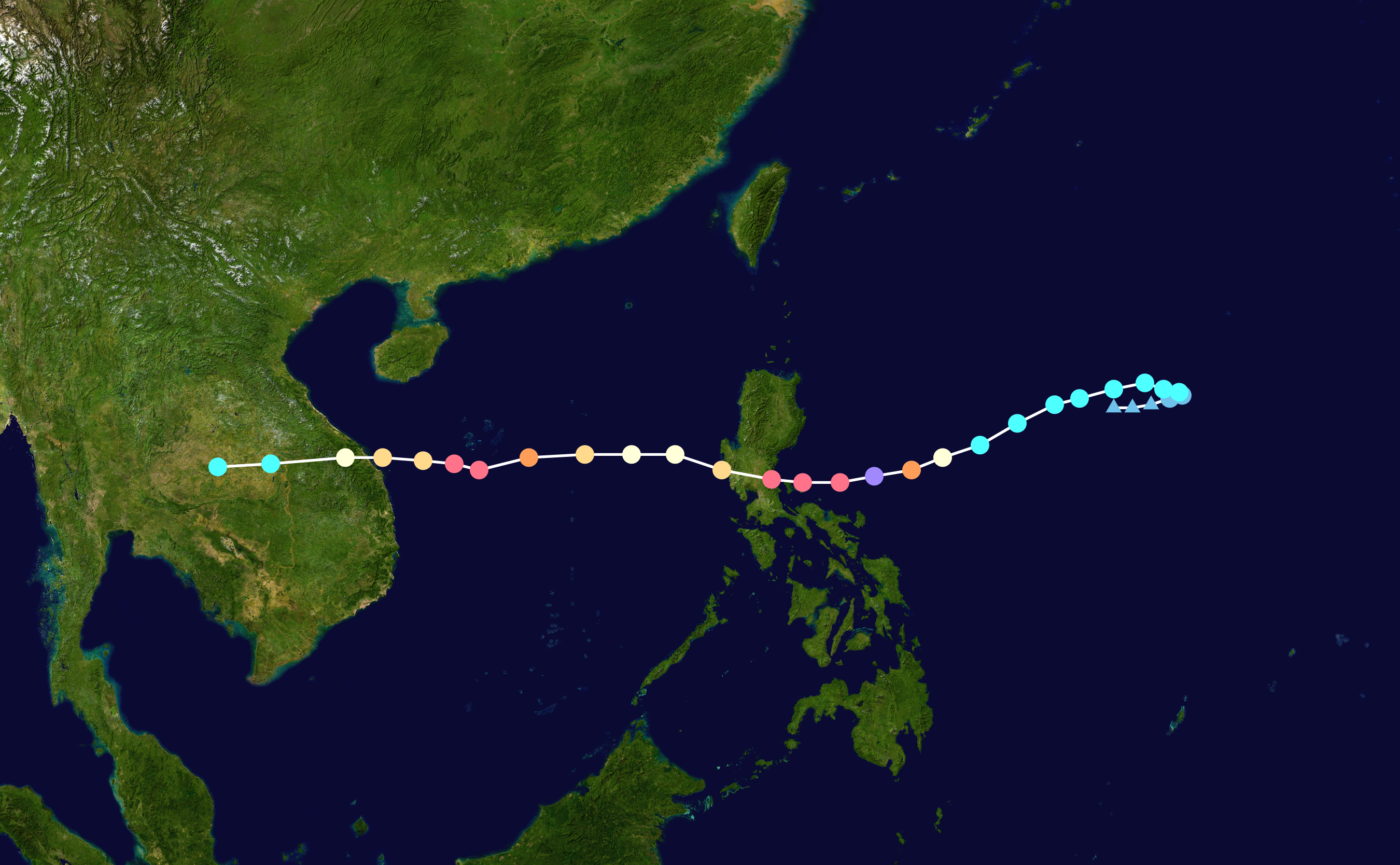
- Duration: September 21 – September 29
- Peak intensity: 175 km/h (110 mph) (10-min); 940 hPa (mbar)

On September 21, a disturbance developed into tropical depression near the Philippines, according to the JMA. The JTWC designated this disturbance as Invest 95W and issued a bulletin noting that the low pressure system could have reasonable intensification due to low wind shear and warmer water. Hours later, the JTWC upgraded the system into a tropical depression, designating it as 18W. The PAGASA then followed suit on 00:00 UTC of September 22, and the tropical depression was assigned the name Karding. A few hours later, the system reached tropical storm intensity and the JMA assigned it the name Noru (2216). On 24 September, Noru entered the Philippine area of responsibility and reached typhoon intensity. Noru then underwent explosive intensification, during which, according to the JTWC, Noru's 1-minute sustained winds increased by 165 km/h (105 mph). At 00:00 UTC, Noru was classified as a Category-5 super typhoon. At 5:30 p.m. Philippine Standard Time, according to the PAGASA, Noru struck Burdeos, Polillo Islands, Quezon Province. When it made landfall in the northern Philippines, the cyclone was downgraded to Category 4 according to the JTWC. At 8:20pm PHT, Noru struck Dingalan, Aurora as a typhoon according to PAGASA. The terrain of the Sierra Madre mountain range weakened Noru as it passed through Central Luzon. Noru then slightly re-intensified in the West Philippine Sea, leaving the PAGASA's area of responsibility on Monday morning. It made landfall near Da Nang, Vietnam on September 28 before JTWC released its final warning on the storm shortly after.

The National Disaster Risk Reduction and Management Council (NDRRMC) of the Philippines reported at least ₱304 million (US$6.18 million) in infrastructural damages and ₱3.08 billion (US$62.5 million) in agricultural damages, totalling to ₱3.38 billion (US$68.7 million). 40 people have been reported dead following the typhoon, another 5 remain missing. In Vietnam, Noru killed 9 people and caused an economic loss of 5.776 trillion VND (US$244.41 million).

=== Severe Tropical Storm Kulap ===
- Severe tropical storm (JMA)
- Category 1 typhoon (SSHWS)
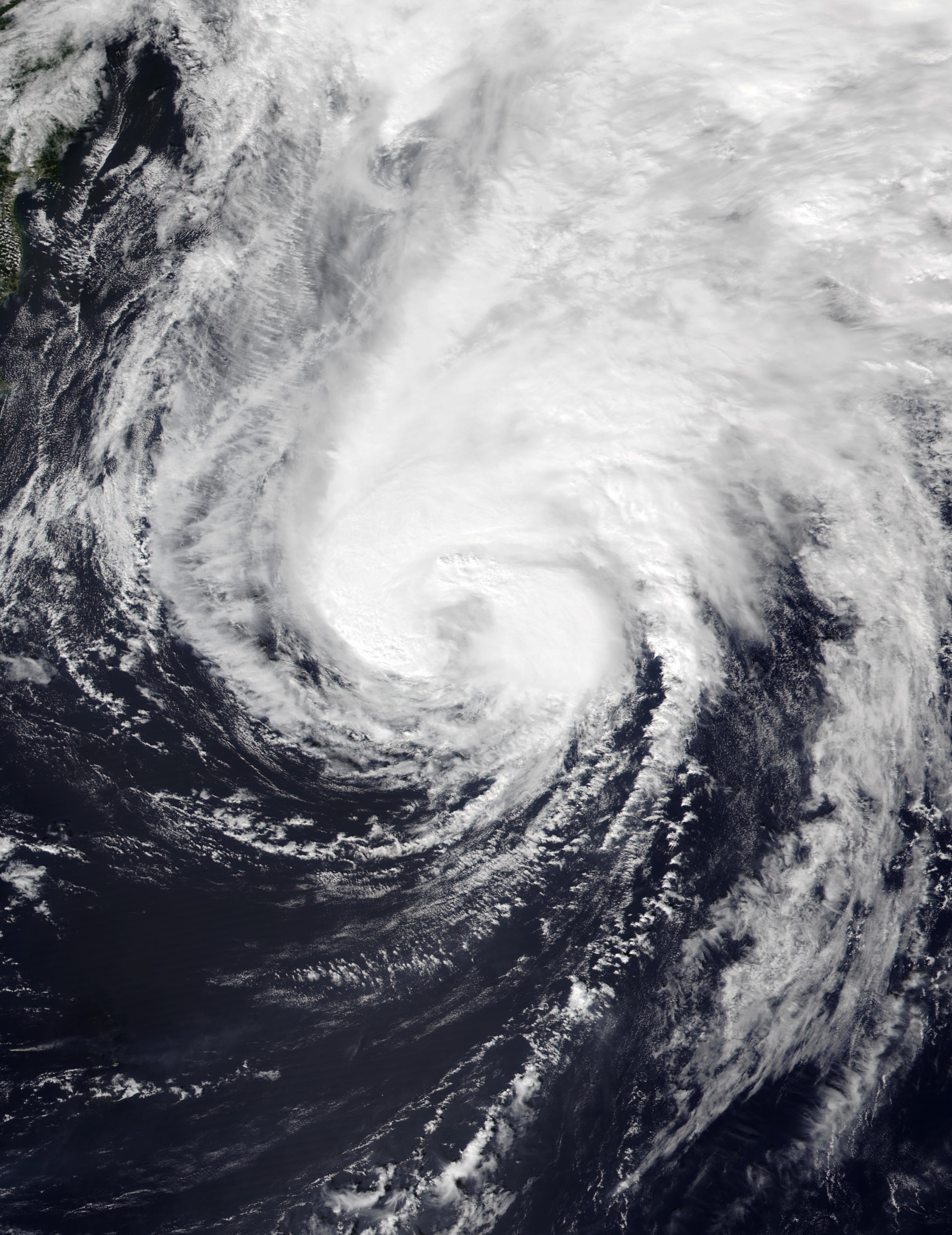
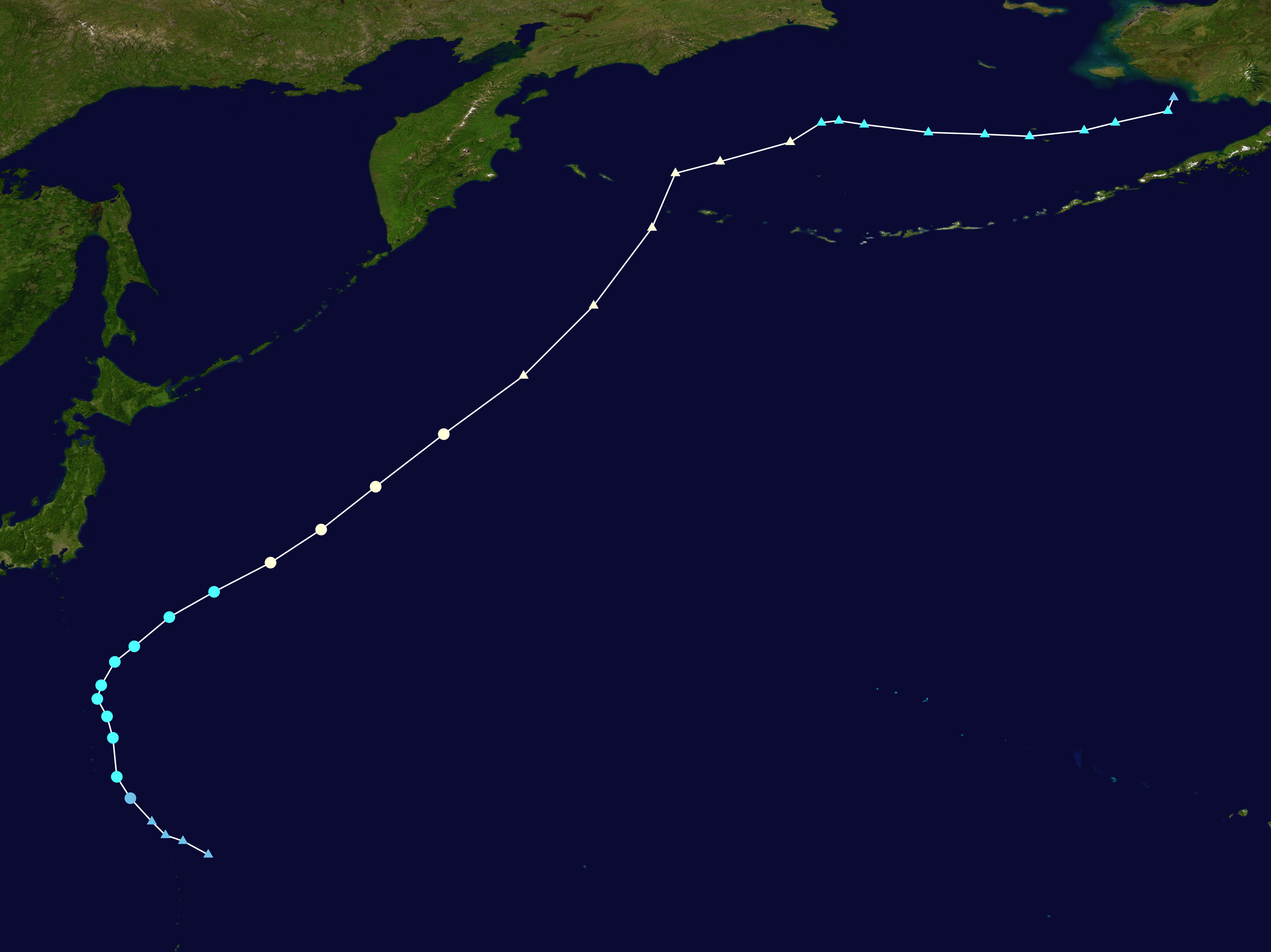
- Duration: September 25 – September 29
- Peak intensity: 110 km/h (70 mph) (10-min); 965 hPa (mbar)

On September 24, the JTWC released a first report on a low pressure system and because it entered warmer waters and low wind shear, the agency named it Invest 96W. The next day, JMA classified the system as a tropical depression. Hours later, the JTWC followed suit, and designated as 19W. The next day, the cyclone intensified and the JTWC in its second bulletin, classified it as a "tropical storm". The JMA followed suit and called it Kulap. The JMA quickly classified it as a "severe tropical storm" but the JTWC went further and upgraded it to a Category 1 typhoon. Upon threatening the Japanese coast, the cyclone continued its course until it was downgraded to a tropical storm, according to bulletins released by the two agencies. By moving to cooler areas and without threatening any habitable areas, the system transitioned into an extratropical cyclone, prompting the agencies to issue their final advisories on the system.

=== Typhoon Roke (Luis) ===
- Typhoon (JMA)
- Category 2 typhoon (SSHWS)
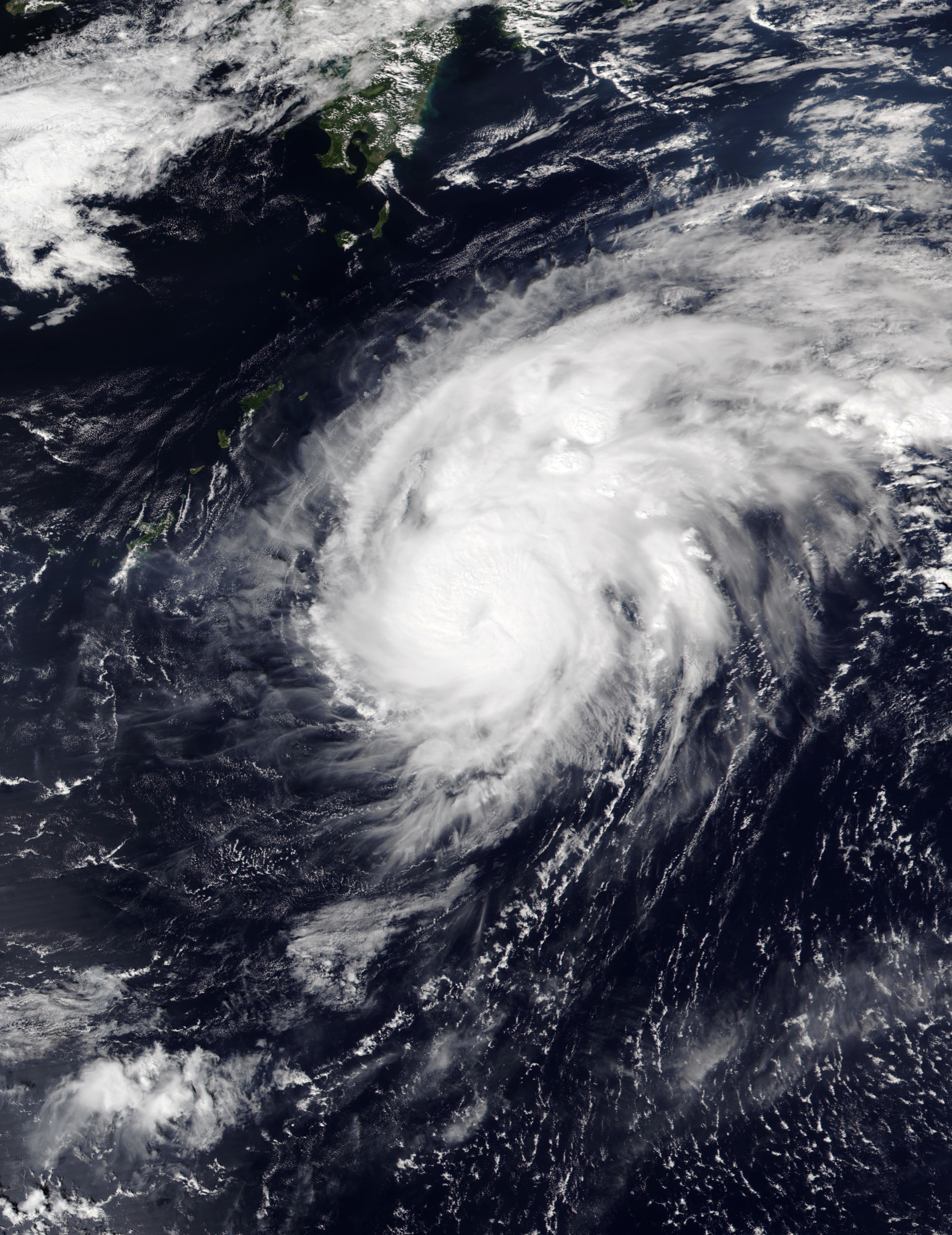
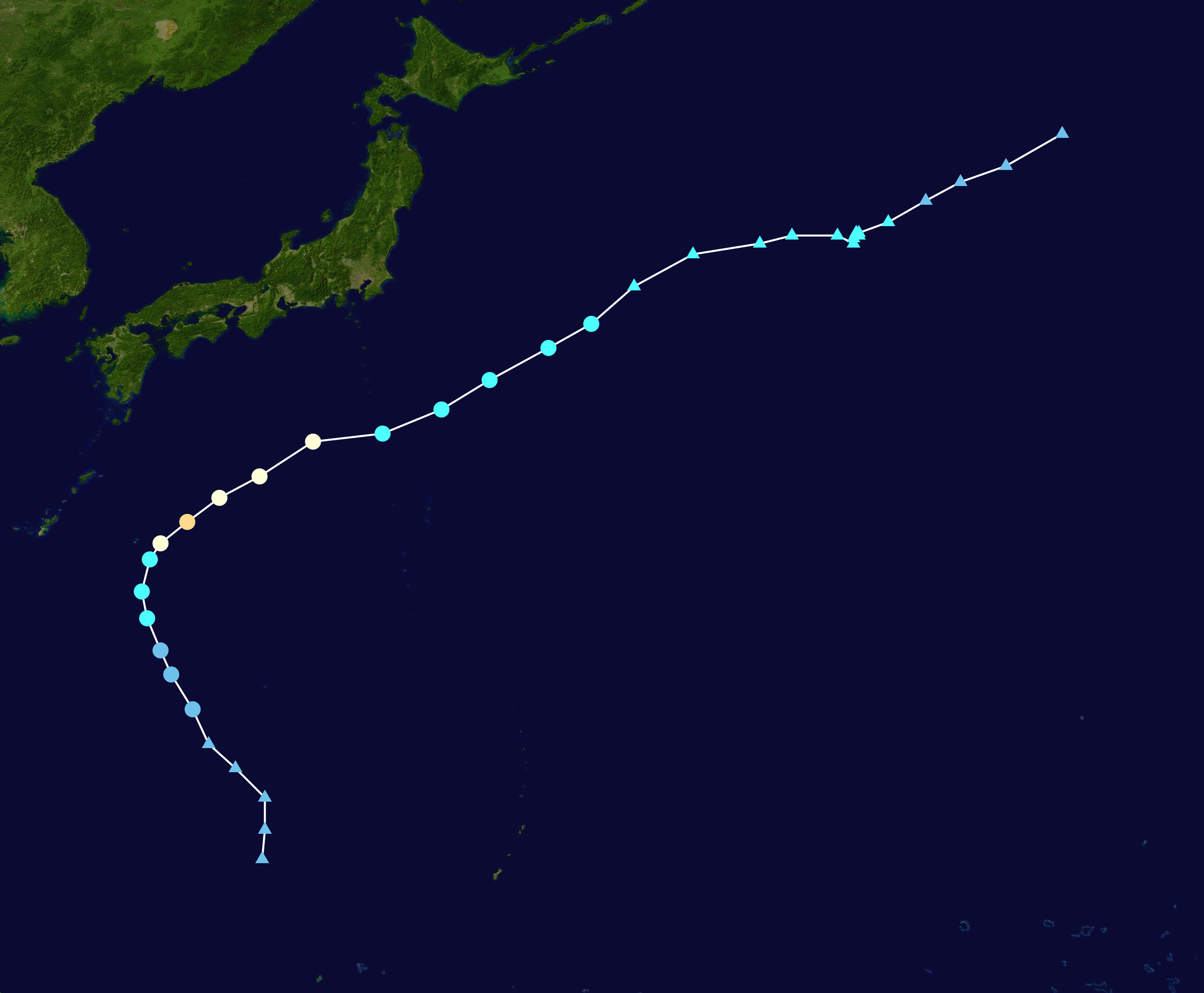
- Duration: September 28 – October 1
- Peak intensity: 130 km/h (80 mph) (10-min); 975 hPa (mbar)

On September 27, the JMA began to monitor a weak tropical depression that had developed in the Philippine Sea and had been designated as Invest 98W by the JTWC. The agency said in a TCFA bulletin that because it was in warmer waters and low shear, there was scope for broader intensification. The prediction was confirmed, and a few hours later, it was classified as a tropical depression, being called 20W. The following day, the storm entered the PAGASA's area of responsibility and was called Luis, but it did not directly threaten the Philippines and left the PAGASA's area of responsibility a few hours later. Subsequently, the cyclone gained strength and reached a "tropical storm" according to the second JTWC bulletin. The JMA named the system Roke. Two days later, the JTWC and JMA classified it as a Category 1 typhoon, The intensification did not last long and Roke was downgraded to a tropical storm. Having the same fate as its predecessor Kulap, the JTWC released a final bulletin in which Roke had been downgraded to an extratropical cyclone. However, the cyclone intensified into a subtropical storm according to the JTWC's special bulletin. On October 1, it weakened into a subtropical depression.

=== Tropical Depression Maymay ===
- Tropical depression (JMA)
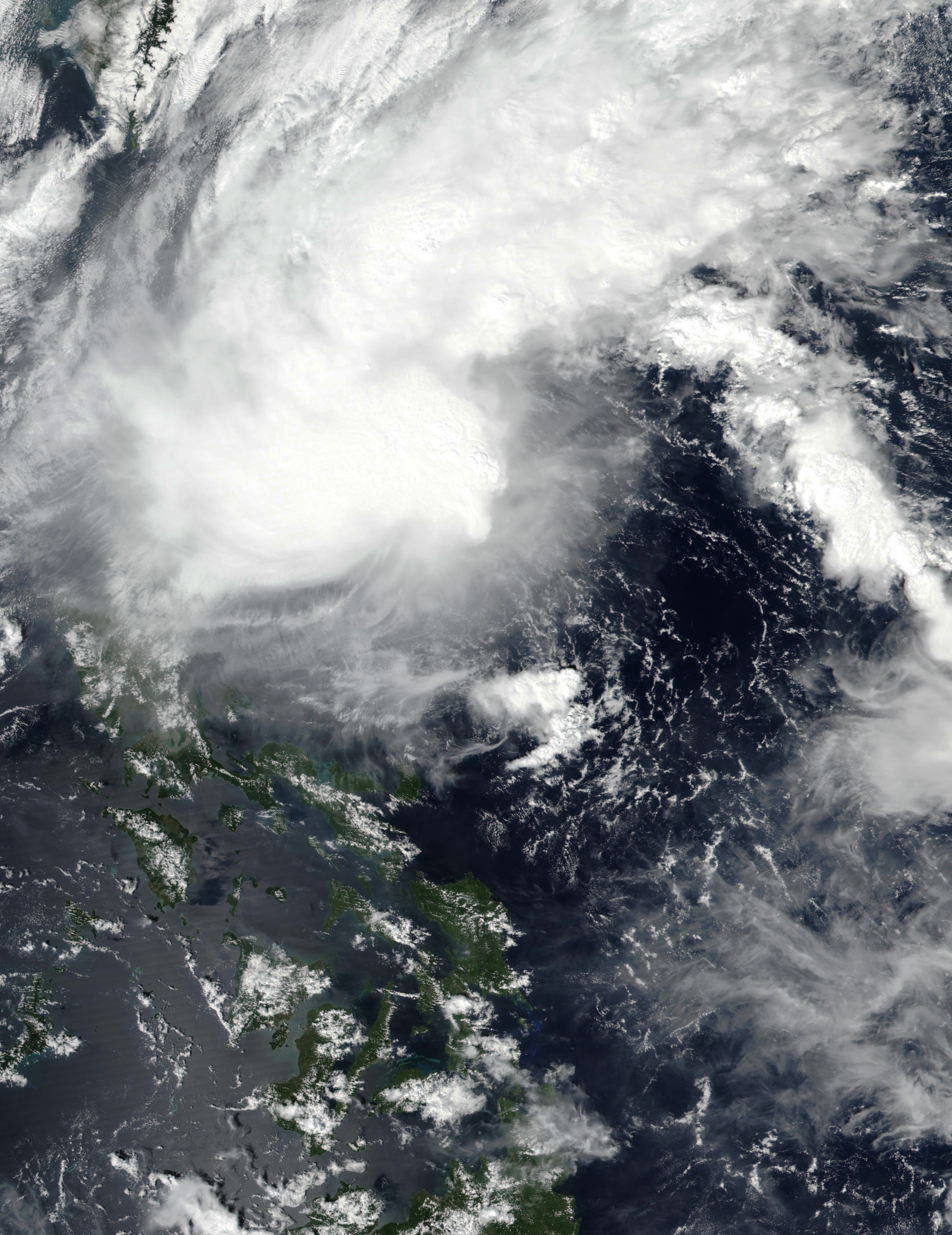
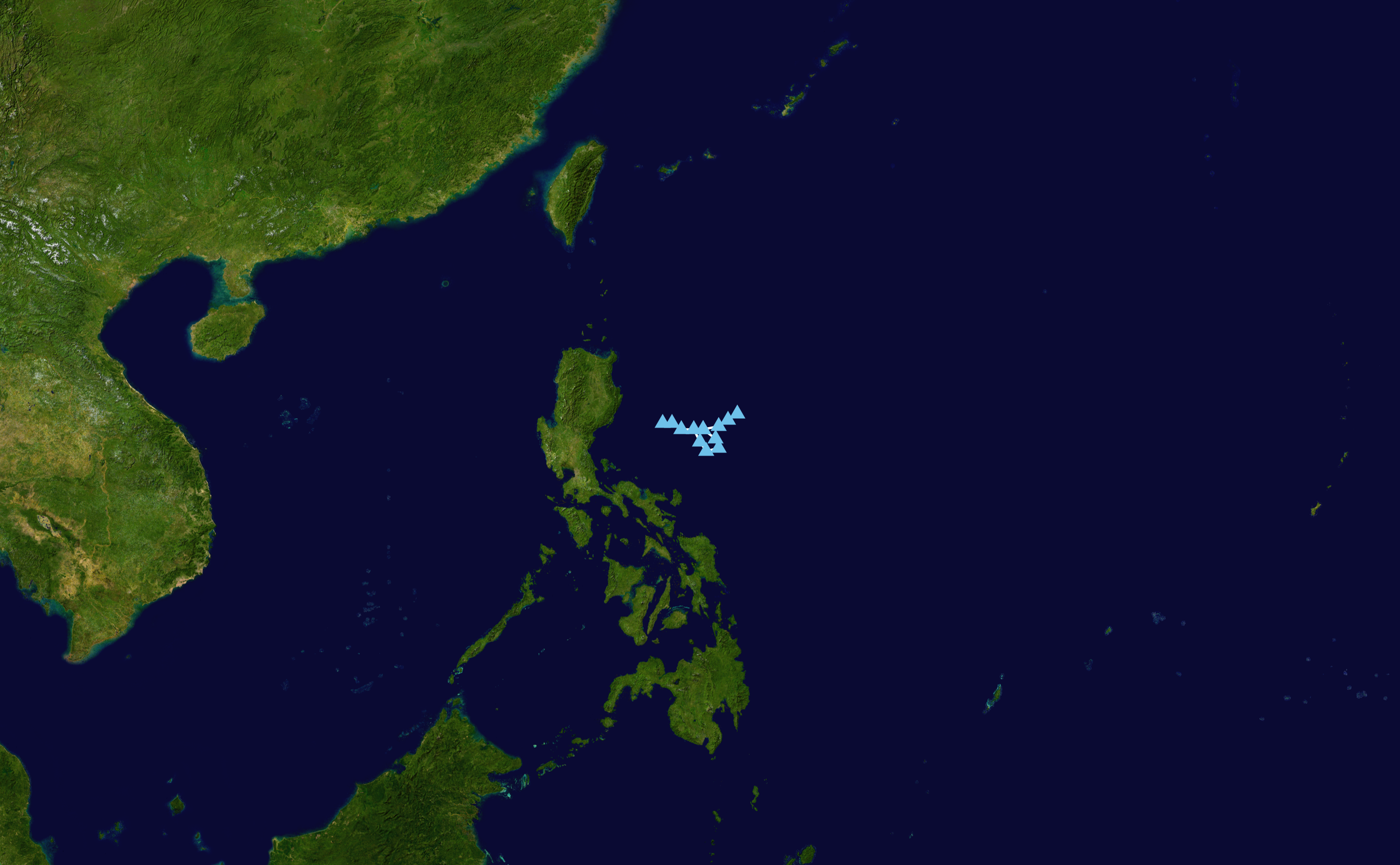
- Duration: October 11 – October 12
- Peak intensity: <55 km/h (35 mph) (10-min); 1002 hPa (mbar)

On October 9, the JTWC started to monitor a persisting area of convection with a poorly defined circulation at approximately 645 nmi (1,195 km; 742 mi) to the east of Manila, Philippines. Under a favorable environment of warm sea surface temperatures, low to moderate wind shear, and strong poleward outflow, the system continued to organize before PAGASA upgraded it as a tropical depression, naming it as Maymay, late on October 10. The JMA subsequently followed suit by the next day. Later that same day, the JTWC issued a TCFA on Maymay, noting that the storm's center was tucked beneath the southeast side of an intense but disorganized convection. However, the storm's convective structure was detached from the main center due to a TUTT cell to the northeast of it, which made the storm weaken as it moved northwestwards, prompting the JMA to downgrade Maymay into a low-pressure area on October 12. The PAGASA subsequently followed suit late on the same day, and JTWC cancelled their TCFA by October 13.

Though short-lived, Maymay killed two people in Cagayan, Philippines. The Provincial Disaster Risk Reduction Management Office (PDDRMO) in Cagayan estimated infrastructure and agricultural damage at ₱533 million (US$9.16 million) and 33,432 individuals were impacted by Maymay.

=== Tropical Depression 21W ===
- Tropical depression (JMA)
- Tropical storm (SSHWS)
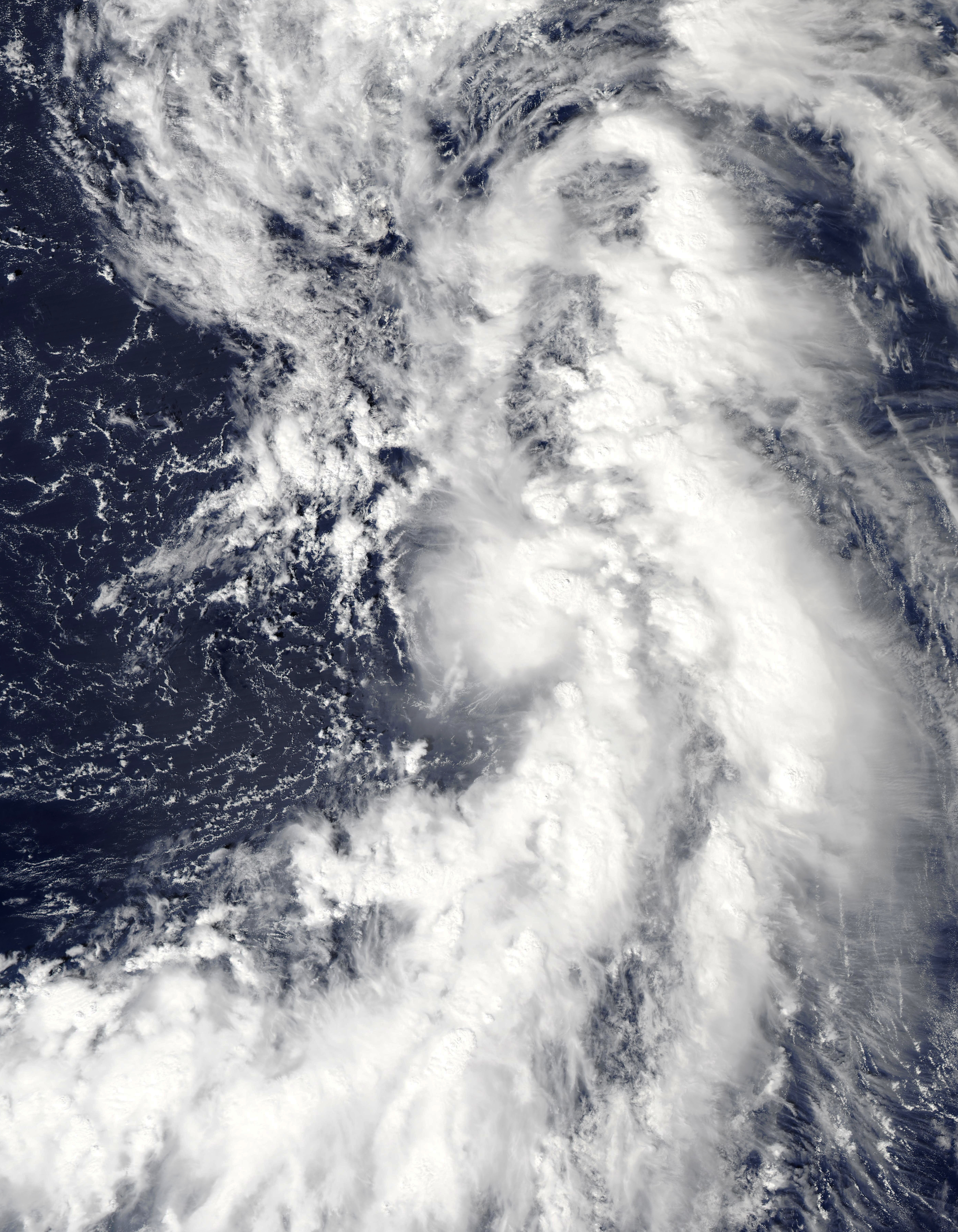
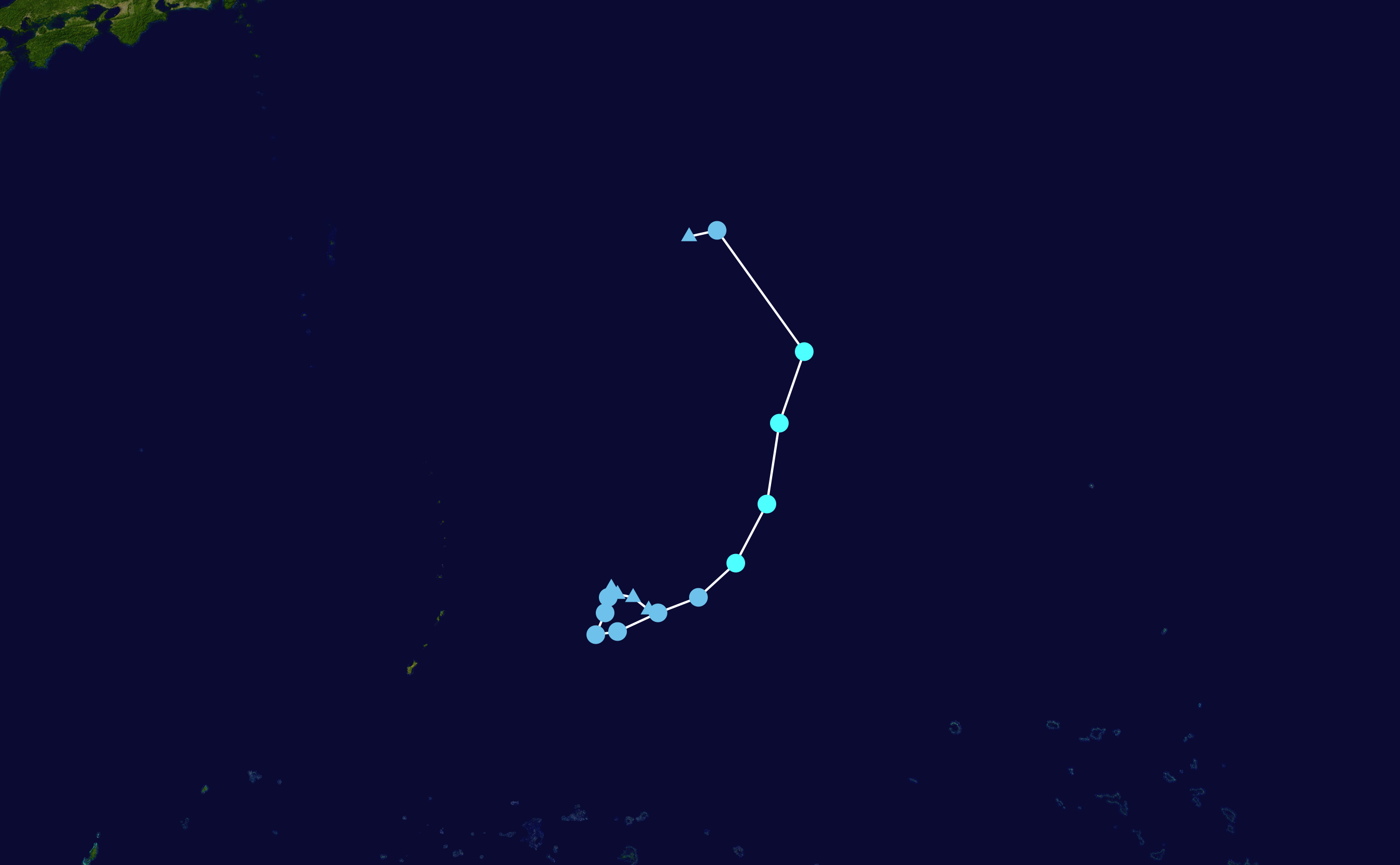
- Duration: October 12 – October 14
- Peak intensity: 55 km/h (35 mph) (10-min); 1002 hPa (mbar)

On October 12, the JTWC started to monitor an organizing area of convection with a fully obscured low-level center at approximately 325 nmi (602 km; 374 mi) to the west of Saipan. Within a favorable environment of low wind shear, warm sea surface temperatures, and fair equatorial outflow, the agency would later issue a TCFA for the system four hours later, and initiate advisories on Tropical Depression 21W at 15:00 UTC the same day, noting the convection of the system became compact and symmetrical, and was displaced slightly from the center. The JMA followed suit three hours later. The system soon became severely sheared by the next day as wind shear increased dramatically while it continued moving eastward, before it got embedded into a convergent outer boundary of a deep TUTT cell positioned towards the northwest, helping the storm re-organize and intensify into a tropical storm by October 14. The storm, however, accelerated north-northeastwards at that point, as it got embedded under strong southerly flow within the eastern periphery of a broad subtropical upper-level low that would later become Tropical Storm Haitang, and it soon opened up into a tropical wave later the same day.

=== Tropical Storm Sonca ===
- Tropical storm (JMA)
- Tropical storm (SSHWS)
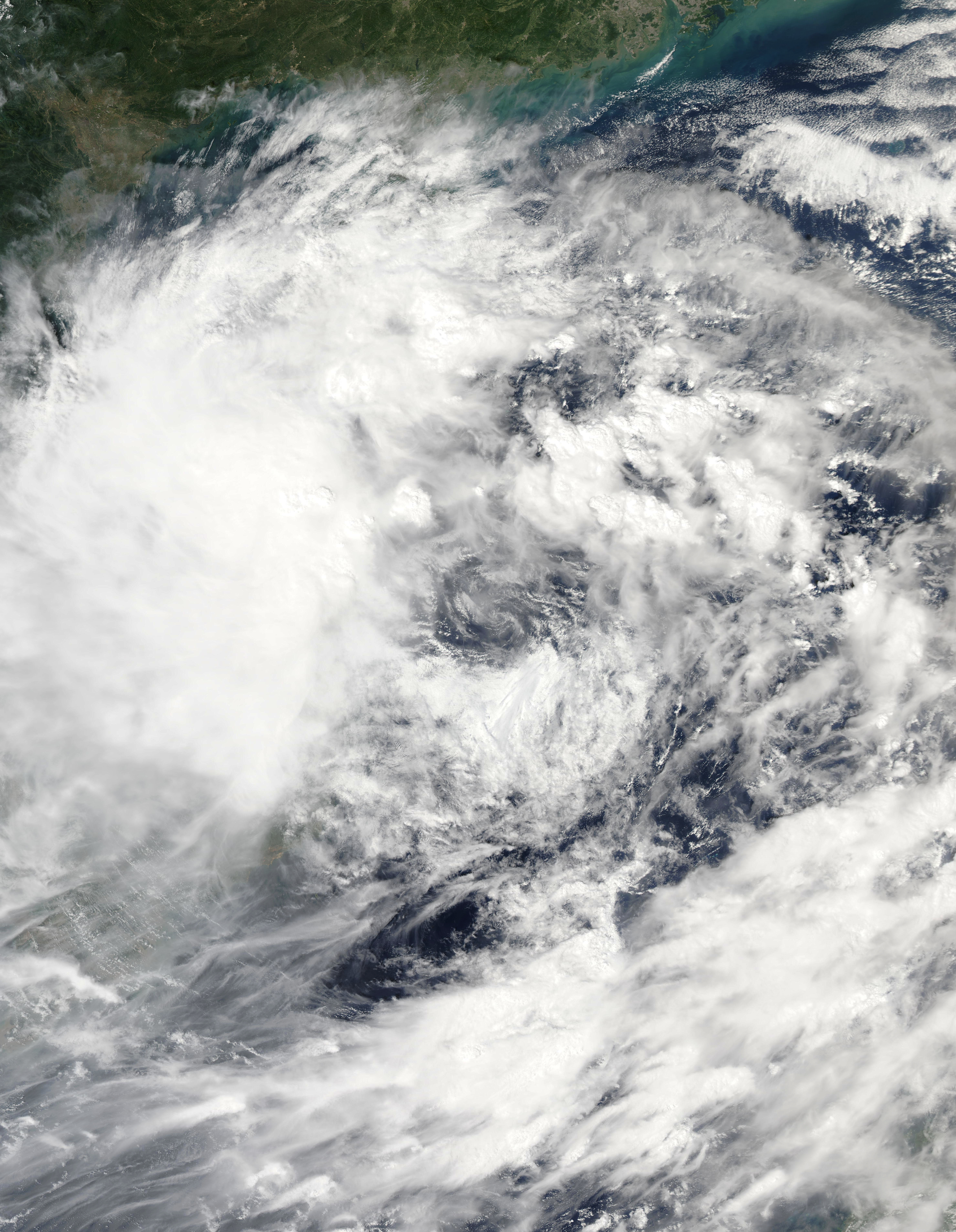
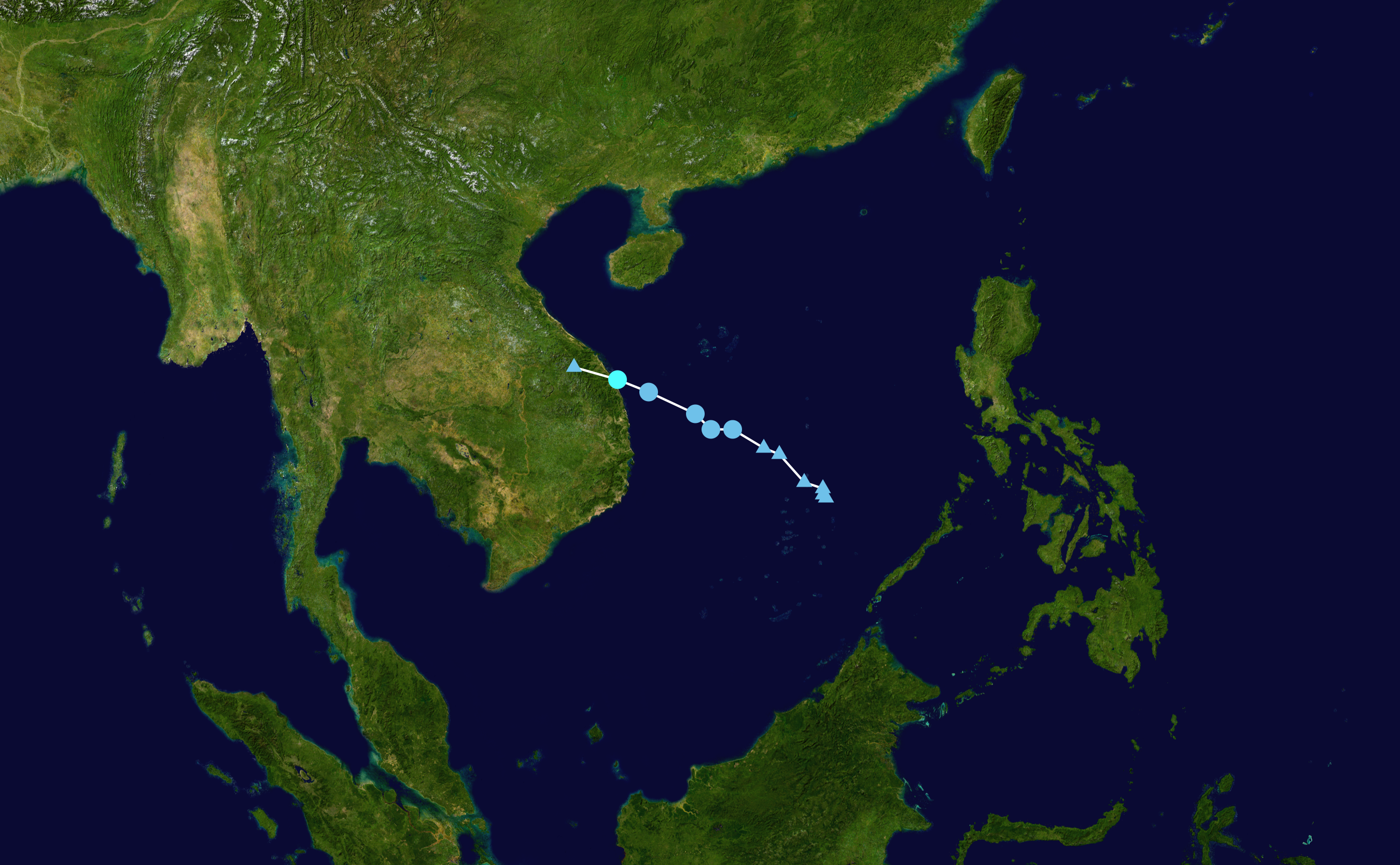
- Duration: October 13 – October 15
- Peak intensity: 65 km/h (40 mph) (10-min); 998 hPa (mbar)

Late on October 11, the JTWC started to monitor a scattered area of convection with a poorly organized broad low-level center at approximately 150 nmi (280 km; 170 mi) to the west-southwest of Manila, Philippines. Within a marginally favorable environment of no distinct outflow established, low to moderate wind shear, and warm sea surface temperatures, the system slightly organized by the next day, with flaring convection and its center remaining exposed. Nonetheless, the JMA upgraded the system into a tropical depression on October 13. The JTWC later issued a TCFA on the system on the same day, noting fragmented deep convection was wrapping into its broad low-level center. By the next day, the JTWC initiated advisories on the storm, designating it as 22W. Moving westward, the storm intensified into a tropical storm six hours later, with the JMA naming it as Sonca. Sonca failed to intensify further as its center remained exposed, with deep convection displaced to the west due to strong wind shear, and it soon made landfall on Da Nang, Vietnam late on the same day, prompting the JTWC to issue their final advisory on the system. The JMA followed suit by October 15, as Sonca weakened into a tropical depression.

As Sonca moved inland, it brought heavy rainfall to central Vietnam, with 700 mm (28 in) of rain fell in Da Nang during a 24-hour period on October 14–15; this resulted in major flooding throughout the region, with 10 fatalities reported. Initial estimated economic losses in Da Nang City caused by Sonca's heavy precipitation are around 1.48 trillion VND (US$60.8 million). Infrastructure losses in Thừa Thiên Huế province reached 337 billion VND (US$13.5 million). 2 people were killed and 4 injured in the province. Overall, damages inflicted by Sonca were 2.4 trillion VND (US$101.5 million).

=== Typhoon Nesat (Neneng) ===
- Typhoon (JMA)
- Category 2 typhoon (SSHWS)
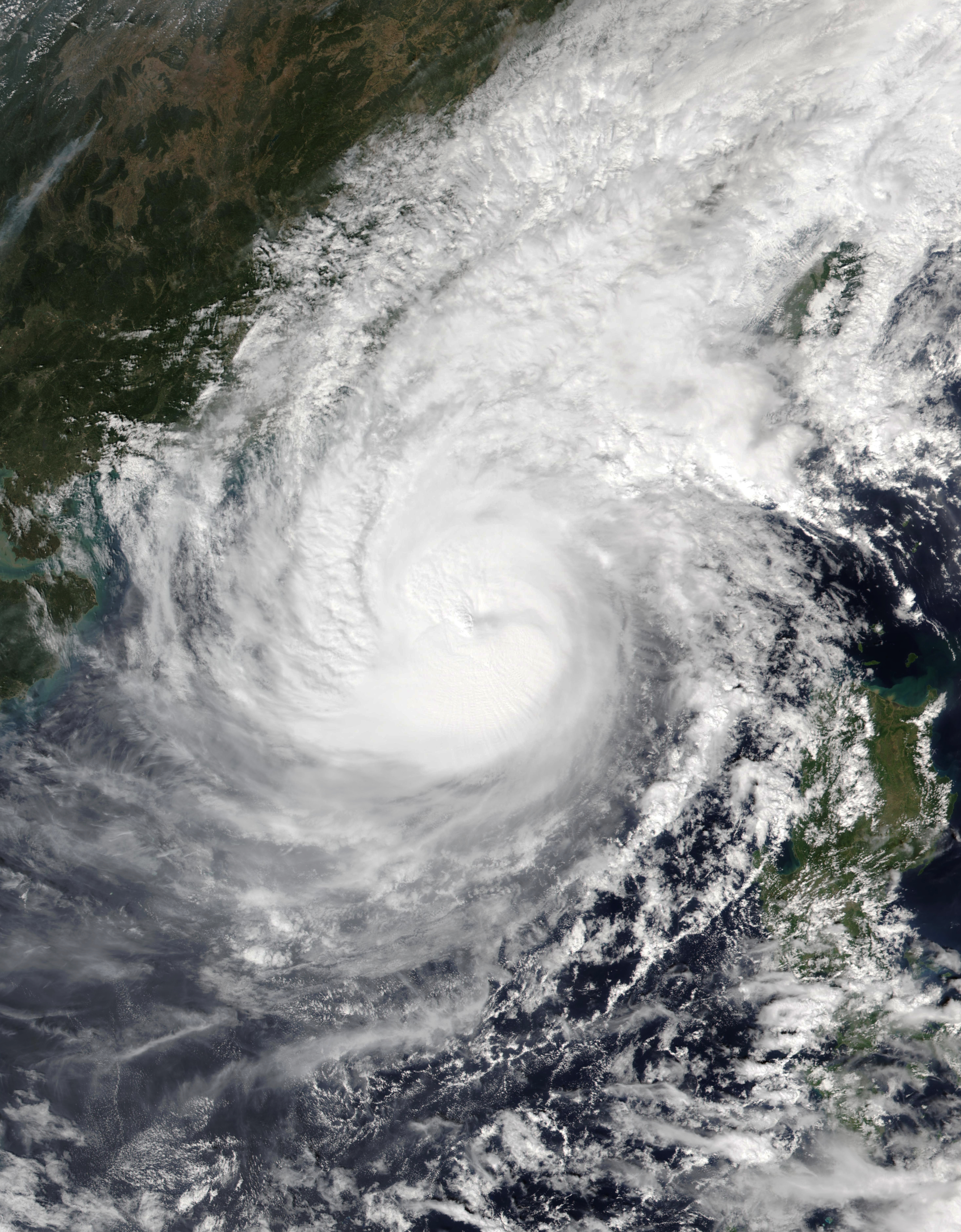
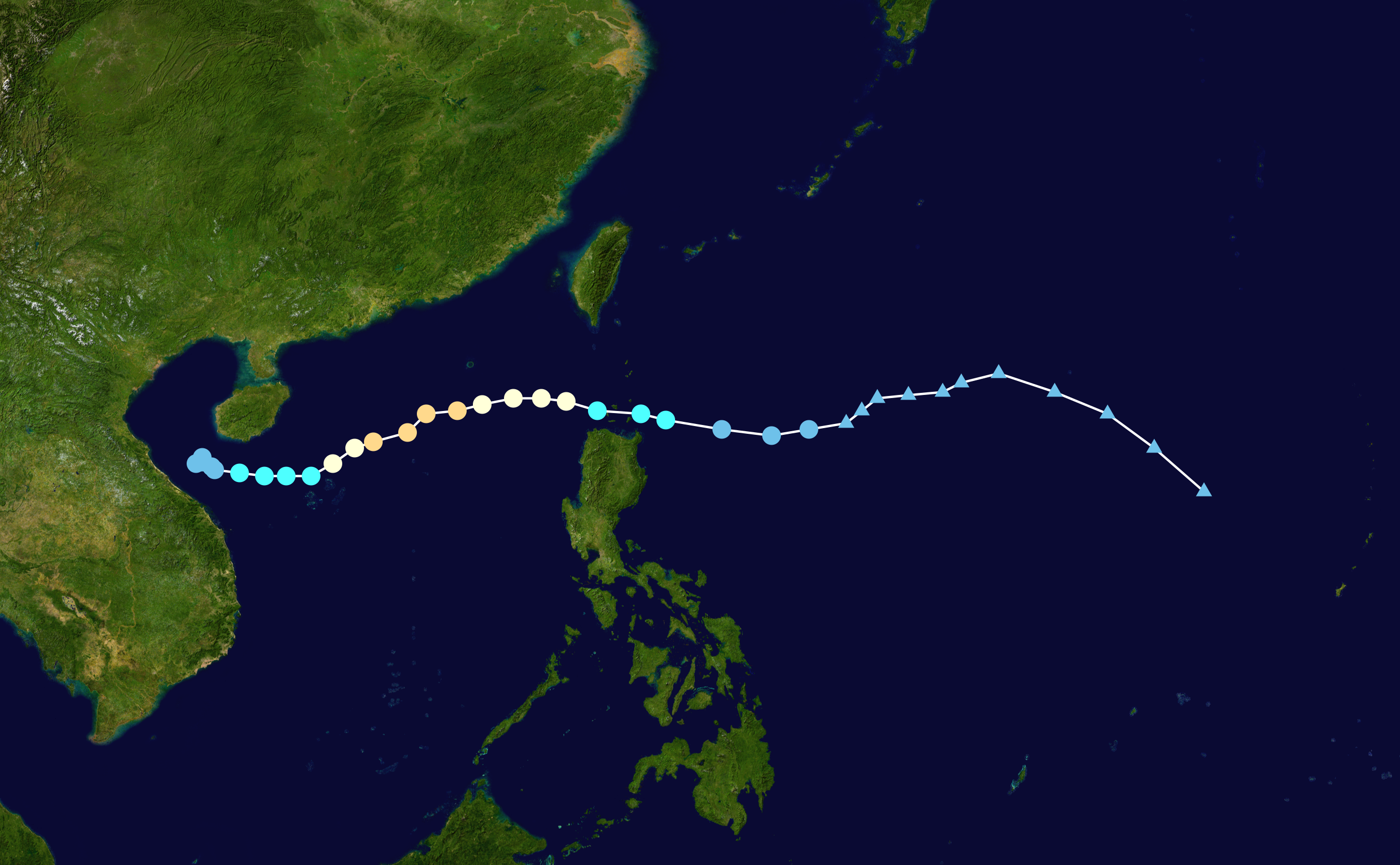
- Duration: October 14 – October 20
- Peak intensity: 140 km/h (85 mph) (10-min); 965 hPa (mbar)

Nesat formed from an area of disturbed weather east of the Philippines, and on October 13, entered the PAGASA's Philippine Area of Responsibility and was named Neneng by the agency. Neneng continued to intensify in the Philippine Sea and was given the international name of Nesat by the Japan Meteorological Agency. On October 16, at 3:50 a.m. Philippine Standard Time, the PAGASA noted that Nesat (Neneng) made its first landfall in the island of Calayan in the province of Cagayan as a severe tropical storm. According to the PAGASA, Nesat underwent "extreme" rapid intensification and became a typhoon after it passed through the Luzon Strait. A day after, Nesat exited the PAR, and the PAGASA stopped issuing advisories on the system.

Flooding in northern Luzon caused damage to buildings and infrastructure. According to NDRRMC, 103,662 people were impacted when Nesat moved through, with 4,459 displaced; there were no fatalities. A final report by PDRRMO estimated infrastructure and agricultural damage at ₱474.2 million (US$8.15 million).

=== Tropical Storm Haitang ===
- Tropical storm (JMA)
- Subtropical storm (SSHWS)
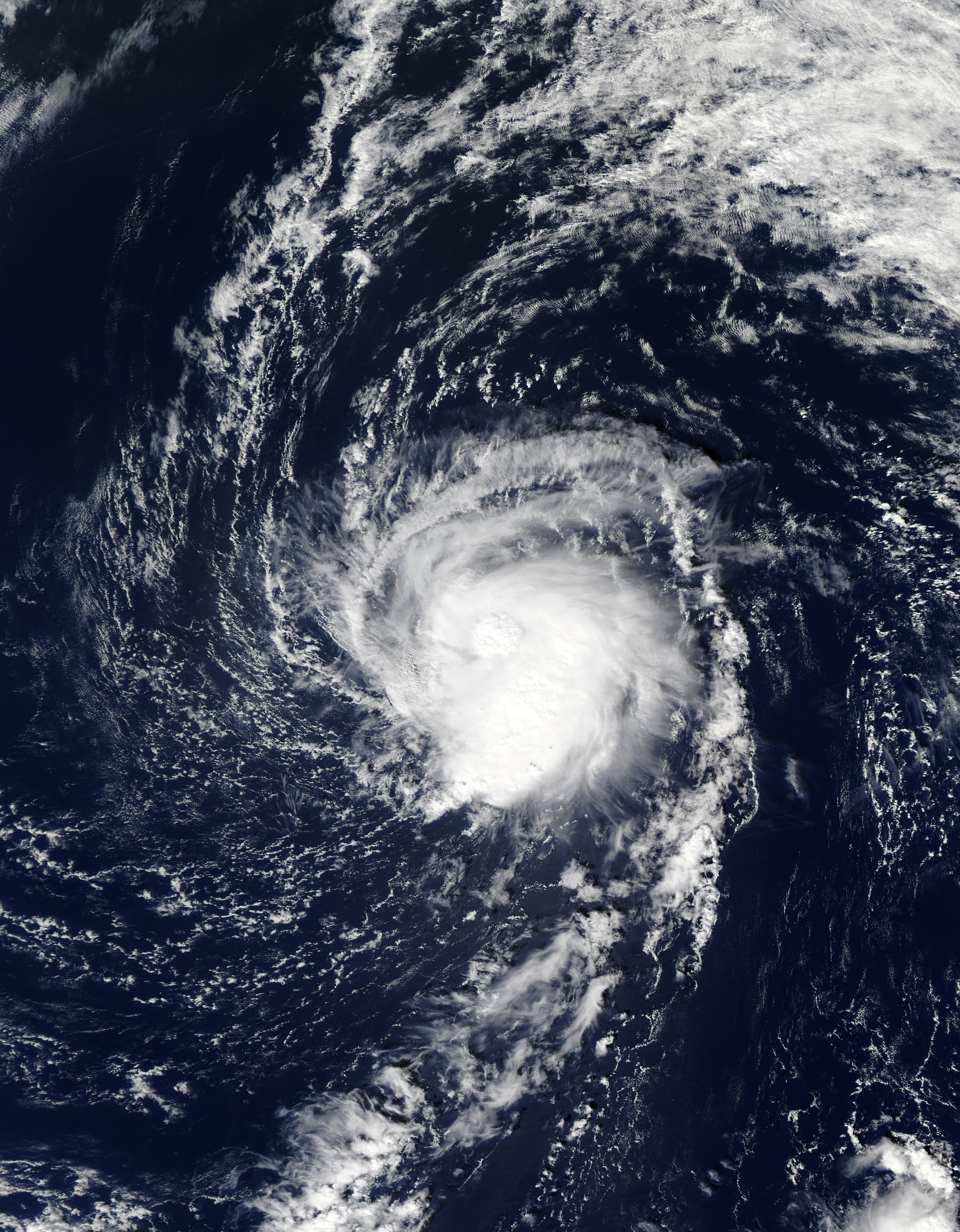
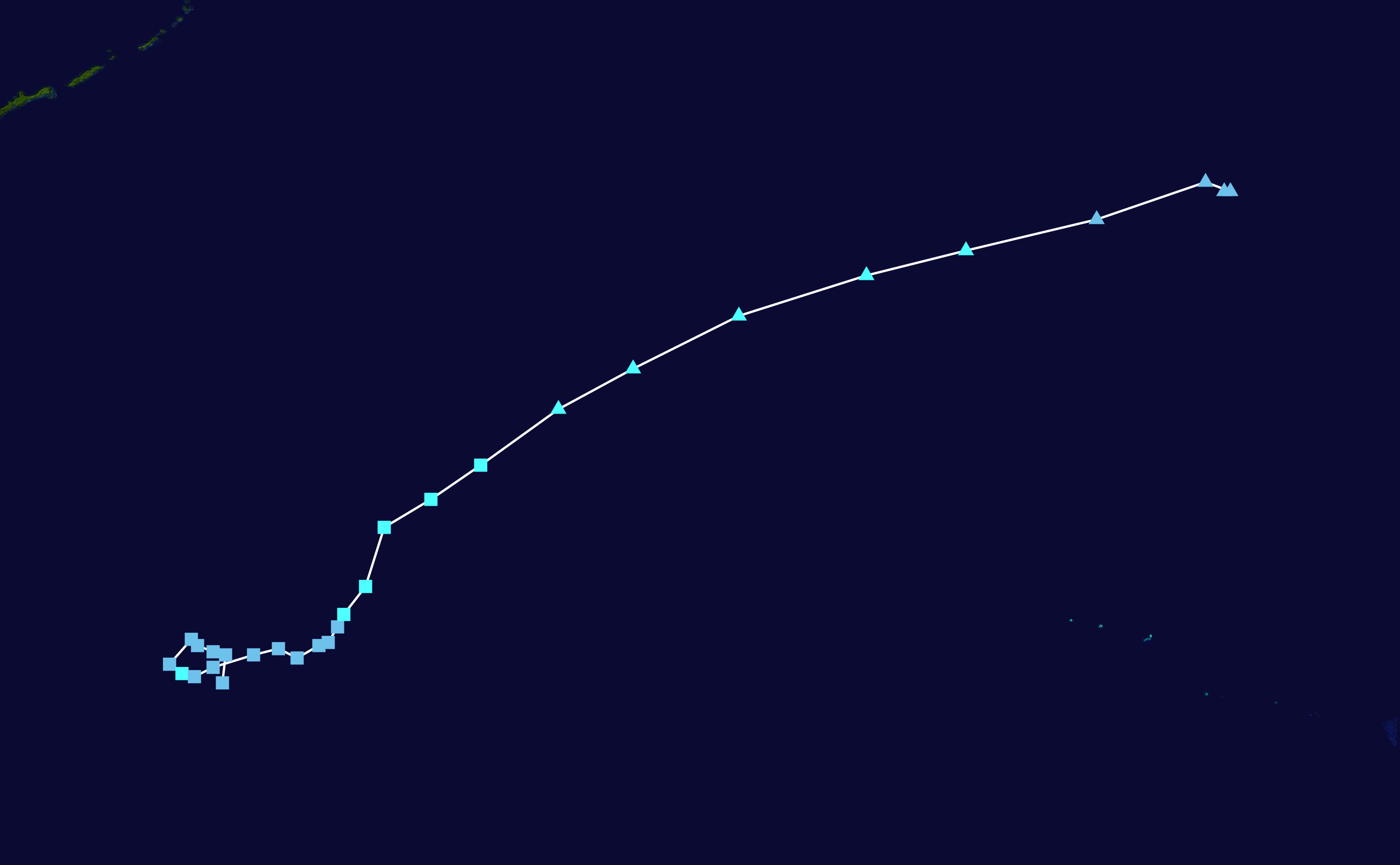
- Duration: October 17 – October 19
- Peak intensity: 65 km/h (40 mph) (10-min); 1004 hPa (mbar)

On October 14, a non-tropical low with subtropical characteristics started to persist north of Minamitorishima and northwest of then-degenerating Tropical Depression 21W. The low remained stationary, slowly weakened and acquired more tropical characteristics next three days, and JTWC eventually declared a tropical depression early on October 18 when the system had been deepening again and became compact. Although the JMA reported a gale-force non-tropical low at the same time, the system was soon analyzed as a tropical storm and named Haitang. The center of the storm soon became weakly defined as extensive dry air entrained the storm, prompting the JTWC to downgrade the storm into a tropical depression and issue their final advisory late on the same day. The JMA, however, continued to issue advisories on the storm as it moved northeastwards, and transitioned into an extratropical cyclone on October 19.

=== Tropical Depression 25W (Obet) ===
- Tropical depression (JMA)
- Tropical depression (SSHWS)
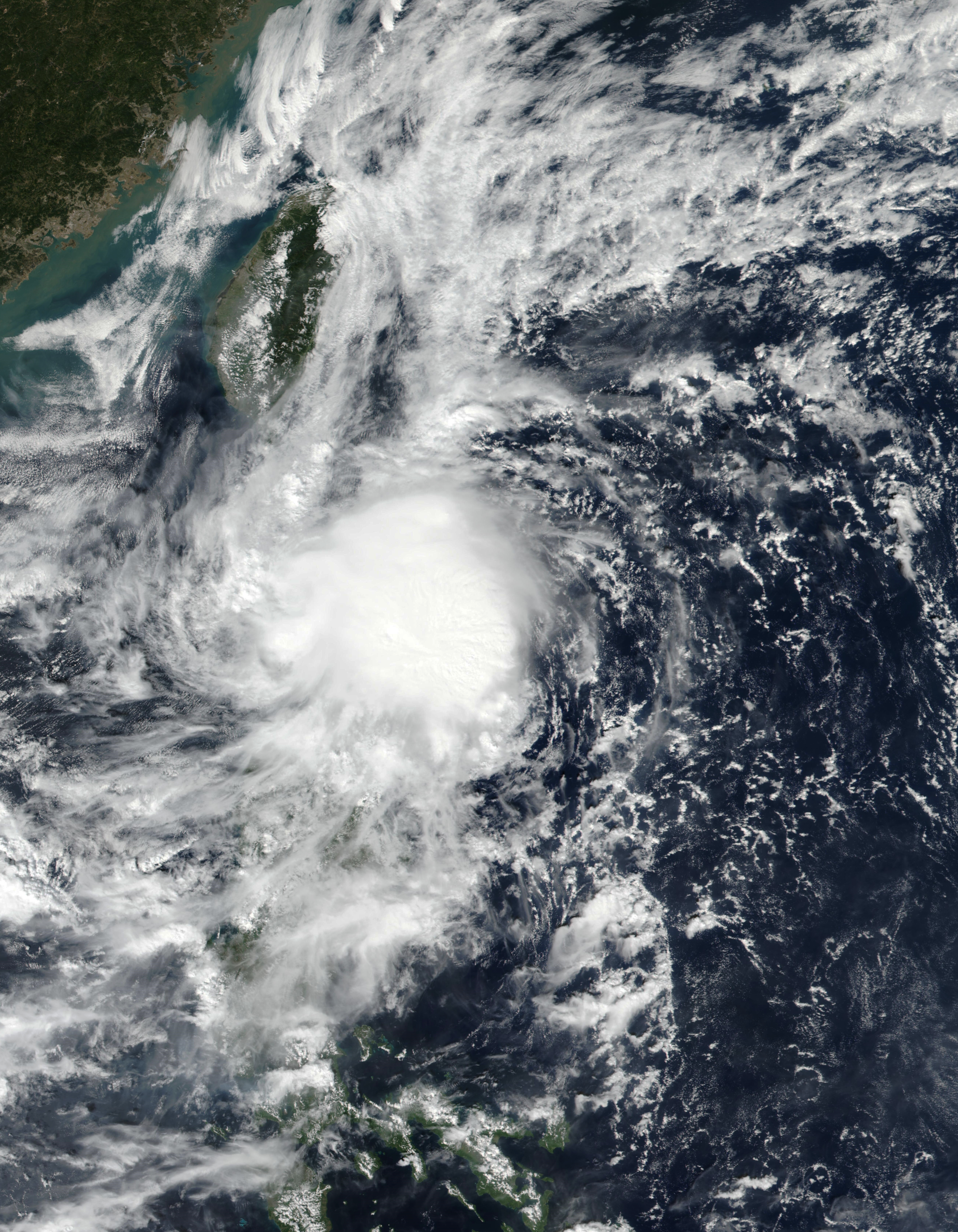
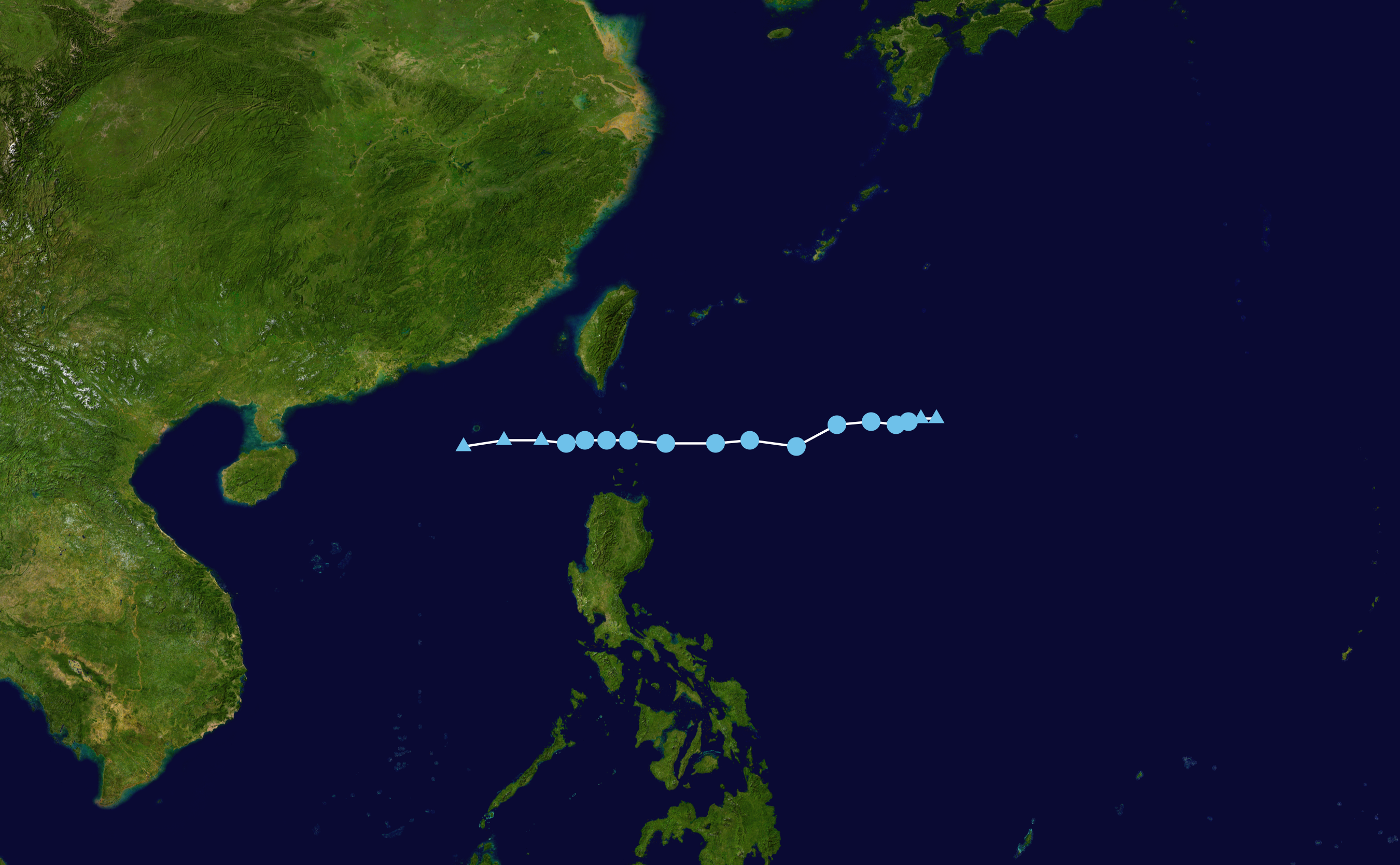
- Duration: October 18 – October 23
- Peak intensity: 55 km/h (35 mph) (10-min); 1006 hPa (mbar)

On October 19, a low-pressure area over the Philippine Sea east of northeastern Luzon developed into a tropical depression and was given the name Obet by PAGASA. The following day, the JTWC upgraded it to a tropical depression, designating it as 25W. The PAGASA initially expected the depression to be a tropical storm, but the system would not strengthen further. On October 21, 2022, the depression slightly intensified while moving towards the Luzon Strait. The depression decelerated while moving west southwestward over the Philippine Sea and continued to move westward while maintaining its strength as it threatened Batanes on October 21. Later that day, PAGASA would hoist Tropical Cyclone Wind Signal No. 1 for Batanes, Babuyan Islands, and the northeastern portion of mainland Cagayan due to the expected strong winds from 25W. The next day, the depression exited the Philippine Area of Responsibility (PAR) while moving slowly westward. The depression was located approximately 432 km east-southeast of Hong Kong and moved westward at 19 km/h (10 knots), before it dissipated. PAGASA forecasted that 25W would generate heavy rainfall over parts of northern Luzon by October 22, 2022. However, later that day, the state weather bureau said that 25W was no longer expected to bring heavy rainfall to the country. The depression gradually weakened and was classified as a remnant low on October 23.

According to Municipal Disaster Risk Reduction & Management Office (MDRRMO), two deaths, a fisherman and his wife, were reported due to 25W. According to the DSWD DROMIC Report #6, a total of 7,327 families or 24,245 people were affected in 74 barangays. Tropical Depression 25W did not have a direct impact on the Philippines but would pass winds and heavy rains in some areas such as Batanes and Babuyan Islands. Despite the fact that the depression did not make landfall in the Philippine, it would pass very close to the province of Batanes on evening of October 21, causing rain and strong winds in Northern Luzon. The NDRRMC didn't receive any damage related to the depression.

=== Severe Tropical Storm Nalgae (Paeng) ===
- Severe tropical storm (JMA)
- Category 1 typhoon (SSHWS)
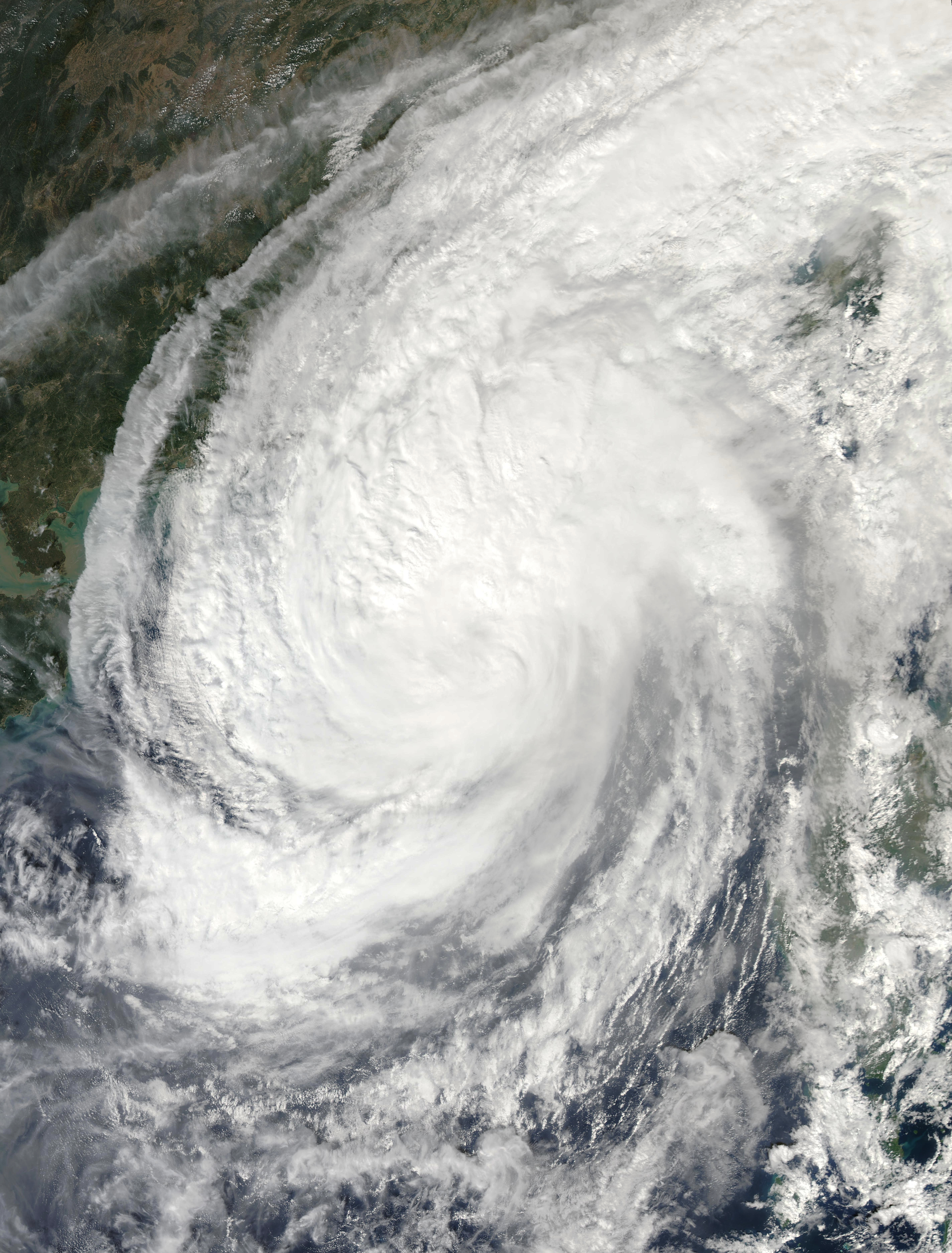
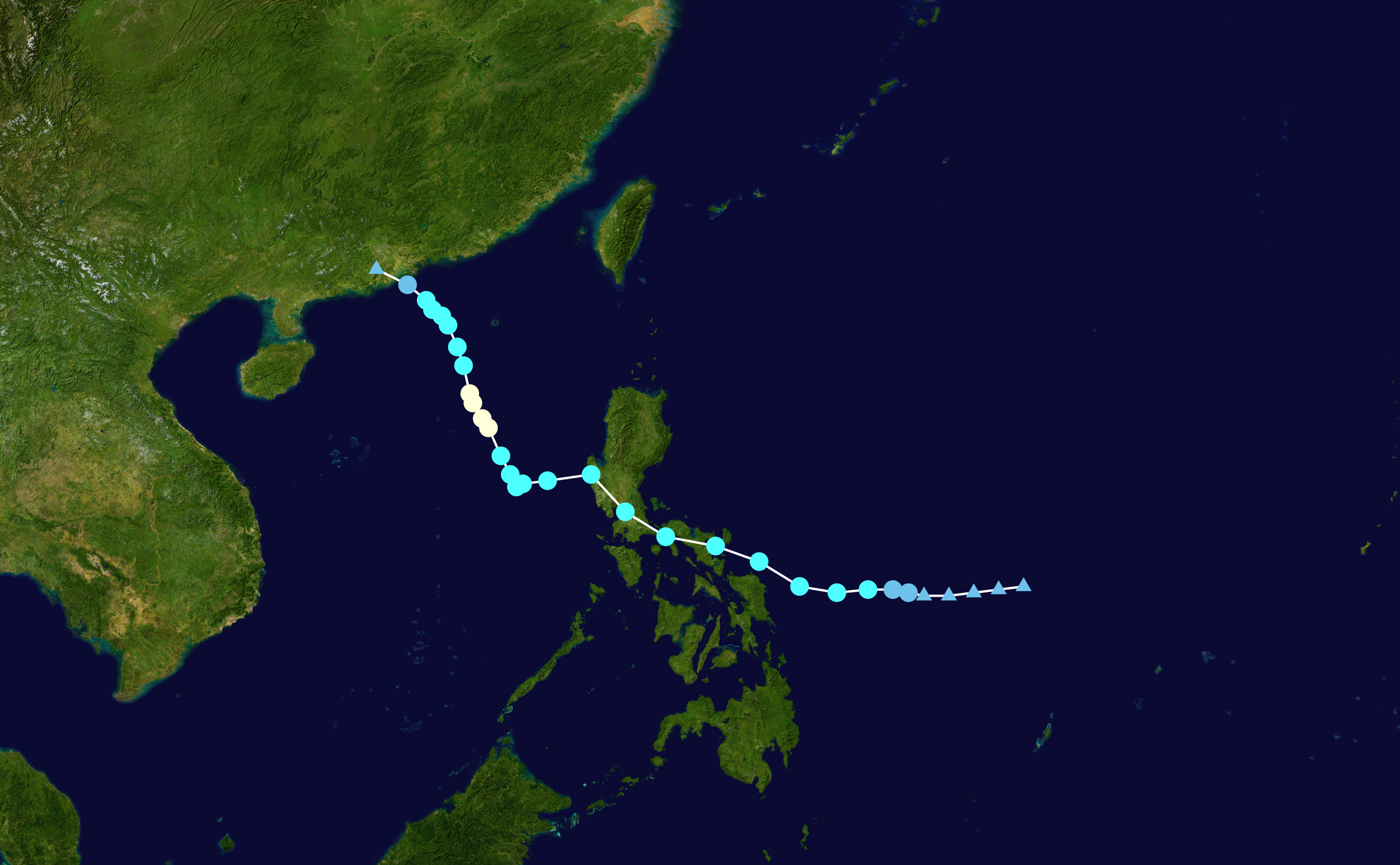
- Duration: October 26 – November 3
- Peak intensity: 110 km/h (70 mph) (10-min); 975 hPa (mbar)

On October 26, the JTWC reported in its TCFA (Tropical Cyclone Formation Alert) that a low pressure area near the Philippines was able to develop because of warm waters and low wind shear. The agency designated it as Invest 93W. The JMA and the PAGASA then classified the disturbance as a tropical depression, with the latter assigning the name Paeng to the system. The JTWC upgraded the system to a tropical depression a day later, at 00:00 UTC on October 27, and it was given the designation 26W. At the same time, the JMA upgraded the typhoon to a tropical storm, and was named Nalgae. The following day, PAGASA and JTWC classified it as a severe tropical storm approaching the northeast of the Philippines. PAGASA issued danger alerts (Signal No. 3), informing that damage could be registered as Paeng approached the archipelago. On 17:10 UTC on October 28, Nalgae made its first landfall at Virac, Catanduanes, followed by another landfall at Caramoan, Camarines Sur just thirty minutes later. It crossed the Bicol Region and exited into the Sibuyan Sea, and later made its third landfall in Buenavista, Quezon, maintaining its strength as it did so. Nalgae then headed southwestward and struck Mogpog in the island province of Marinduque, then later crossed the Sibuyan Sea again and made its fifth landfall in Sariaya, once again in the province of Quezon, later passing into Laguna. Nalgae then passed through Metro Manila and Rizal, heading into Bulacan by evening of October 29. By the next day, Nalgae weakened into a tropical storm in the West Philippine Sea, but re-intensified into a severe tropical storm a few hours later, and exited the Philippine Area of Responsibility a day later. Upon its exit from Philippine jurisdiction, Nalgae then intensified into a Category 1-equivalent typhoon on JTWC; however, the JMA maintained its severe tropical storm classification for the system. It then approached the Pearl River Delta, prompting officials in Hong Kong and Macau to raise Signal No. 8 from November 1 to 2. At around 04:50 CST on November 3, 2022, Nalgae made its final landfall at Xiangzhou District, Zhuhai as a tropical depression, making it the first tropical cyclone since Nepartak in 2003 to make landfall in China in November.

On the island of Mindanao, at least 68 people died due to continuous flooding and landslides that were partially caused by Nalgae. 14 individuals were also confirmed to have been missing; 11 from the Maguindanao province, and 3 from the Soccsksargen region.

=== Tropical Storm Banyan (Queenie) ===
- Tropical storm (JMA)
- Tropical storm (SSHWS)
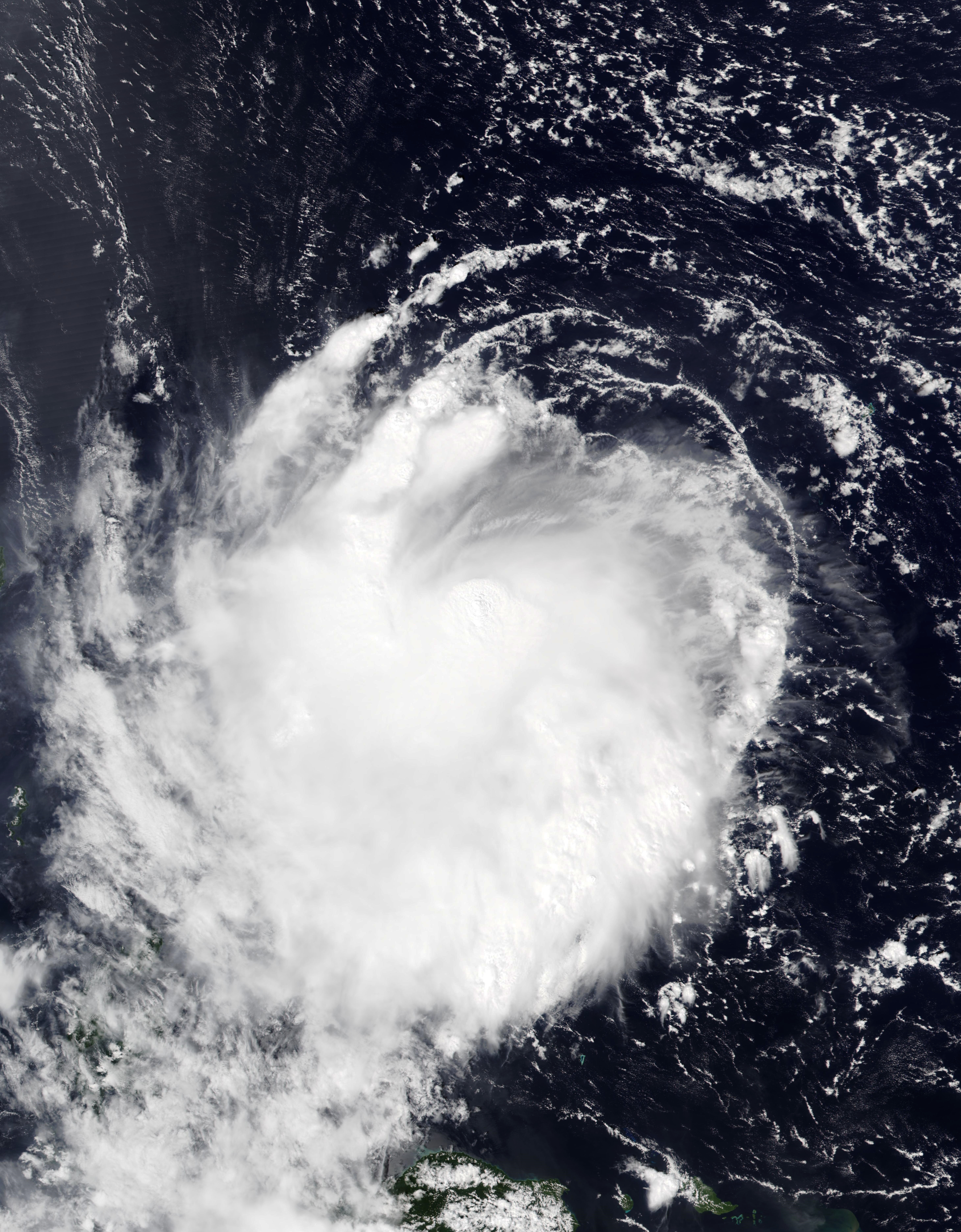
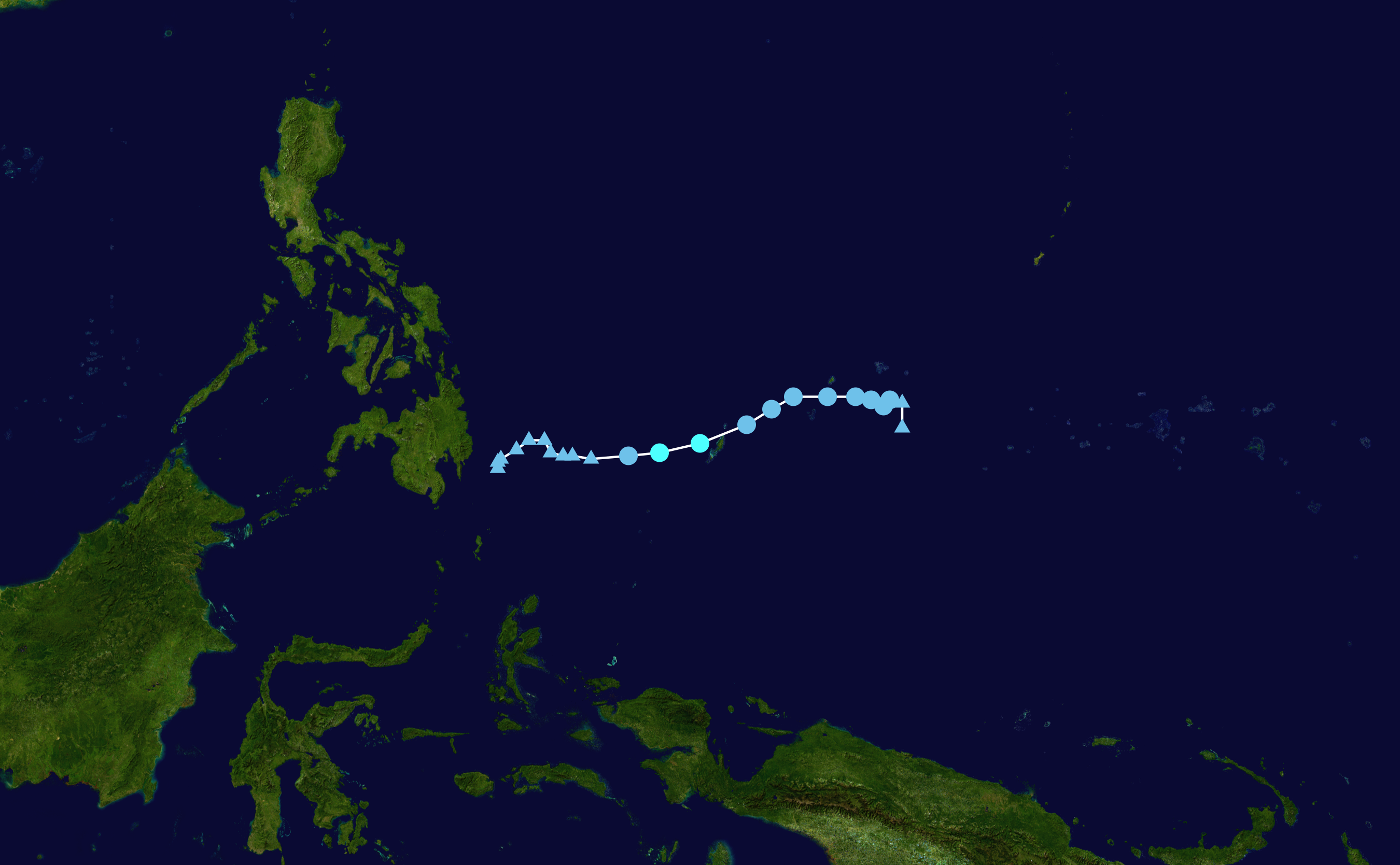
- Duration: October 28 – November 3
- Peak intensity: 75 km/h (45 mph) (10-min); 1002 hPa (mbar)

On October 29, the JTWC released a first TCFA, reporting that a tropical disturbance, designated as Invest 94W, had formed far from the Philippine Sea. However, hours later, the agency canceled the TCFA over this low-pressure area after it had lost strength. However, the agency released a second TCFA, reporting that the disturbance had re-intensified, and classified the possibility of tropical depression as "high". The JMA went further in a bulletin, and already classified it as a depression. At 21:00 UTC on October 30, the tropical depression was designated 27W. Upon entering the Philippine Area of Responsibility, it was given the local name Queenie by PAGASA. Banyan intensified into a tropical storm, and was given the international name Banyan by the Japan Meteorological Agency. As of November 1, 2022, Banyan then weakened due to strong wind shear, and then weakened into a tropical depression the next day after weakening. Later that afternoon, the PAGASA had issued their final advisory on Banyan after it dissipated into a remnant low pressure area. The depression was last seen 200 km north of Sonsorol, moving west-northwestward at 7 km/h (4 knots) over the past 6 hours. The remnants of Banyan continued to cause some rain in eastern Mindanao.

=== Tropical Storm Yamaneko ===
- Tropical storm (JMA)
- Tropical storm (SSHWS)
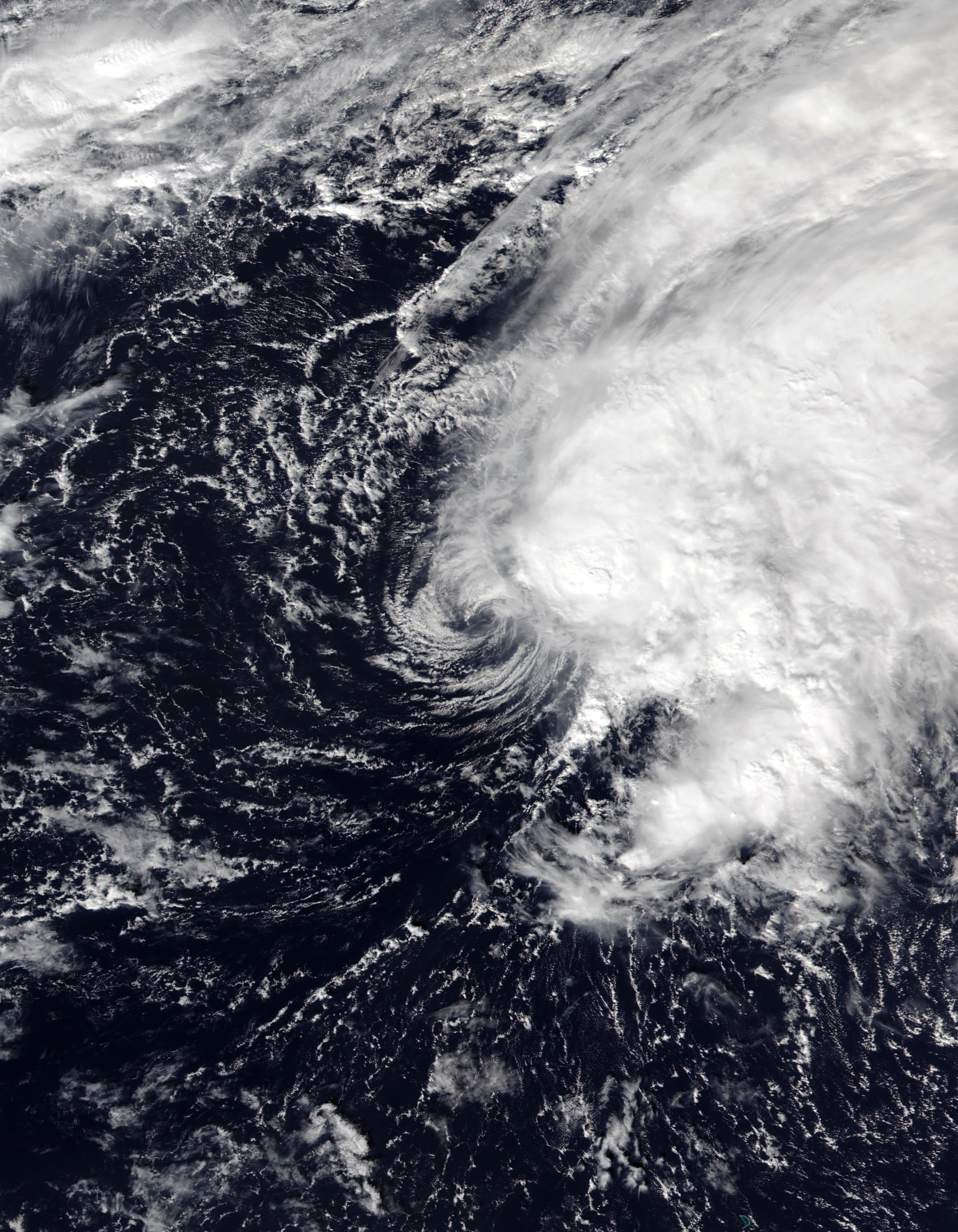
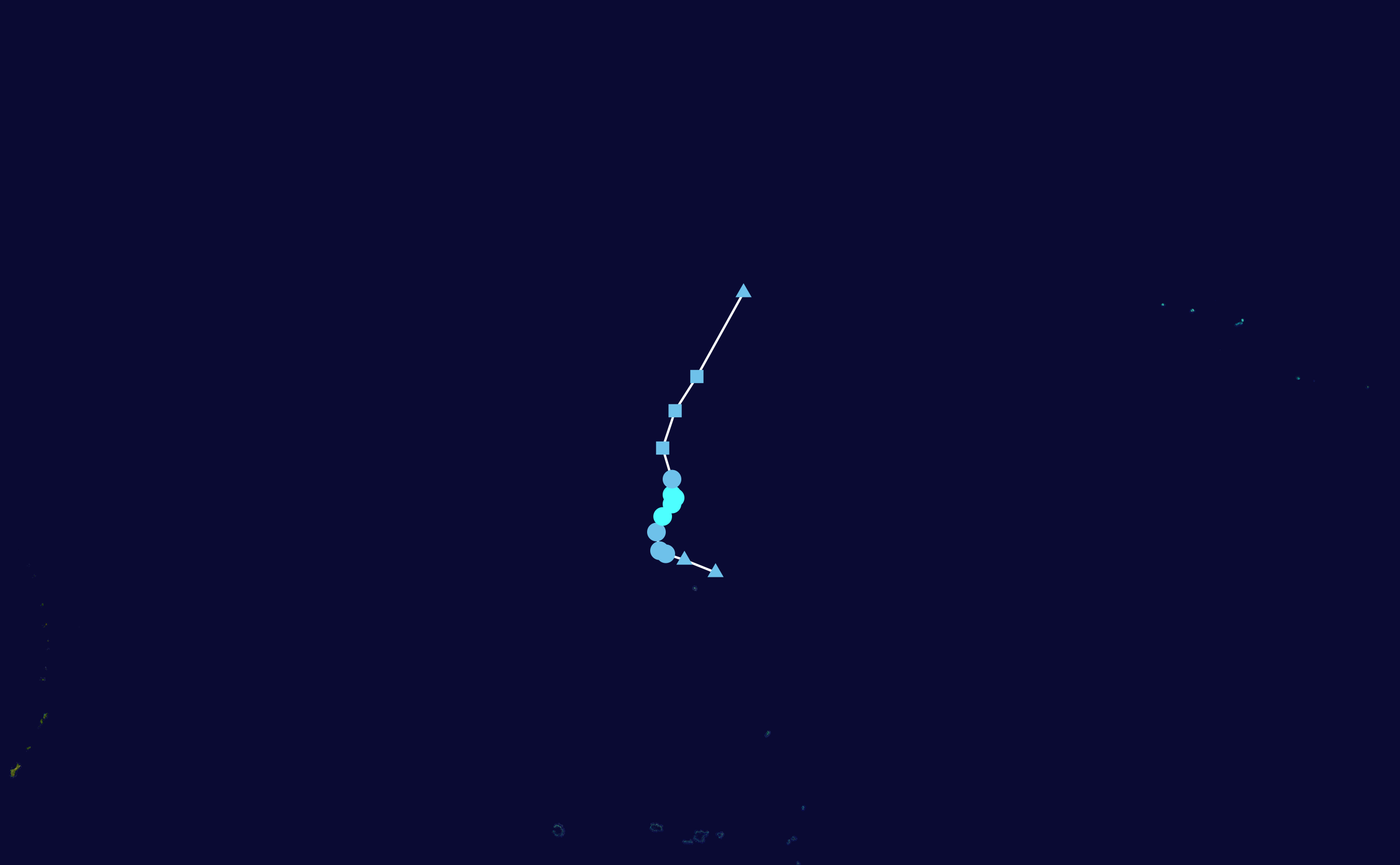
- Duration: November 11 – November 14
- Peak intensity: 65 km/h (40 mph) (10-min); 1004 hPa (mbar)

On November 11, a tropical disturbance formed just to the north of Wake Island. The Joint Typhoon Warning Center issued a Tropical Cyclone Formation Alert, designating it Invest 95W. It strengthened into a tropical depression later on the next day, designated as 28W. The system then strengthened to a tropical storm, receiving the name Yamaneko from the JMA. The system was short-lived and weakened due to cooler sea temperatures. The system dissipated on the morning of November 14.

=== Tropical Storm Pakhar (Rosal) ===
- Tropical storm (JMA)
- Tropical storm (SSHWS)
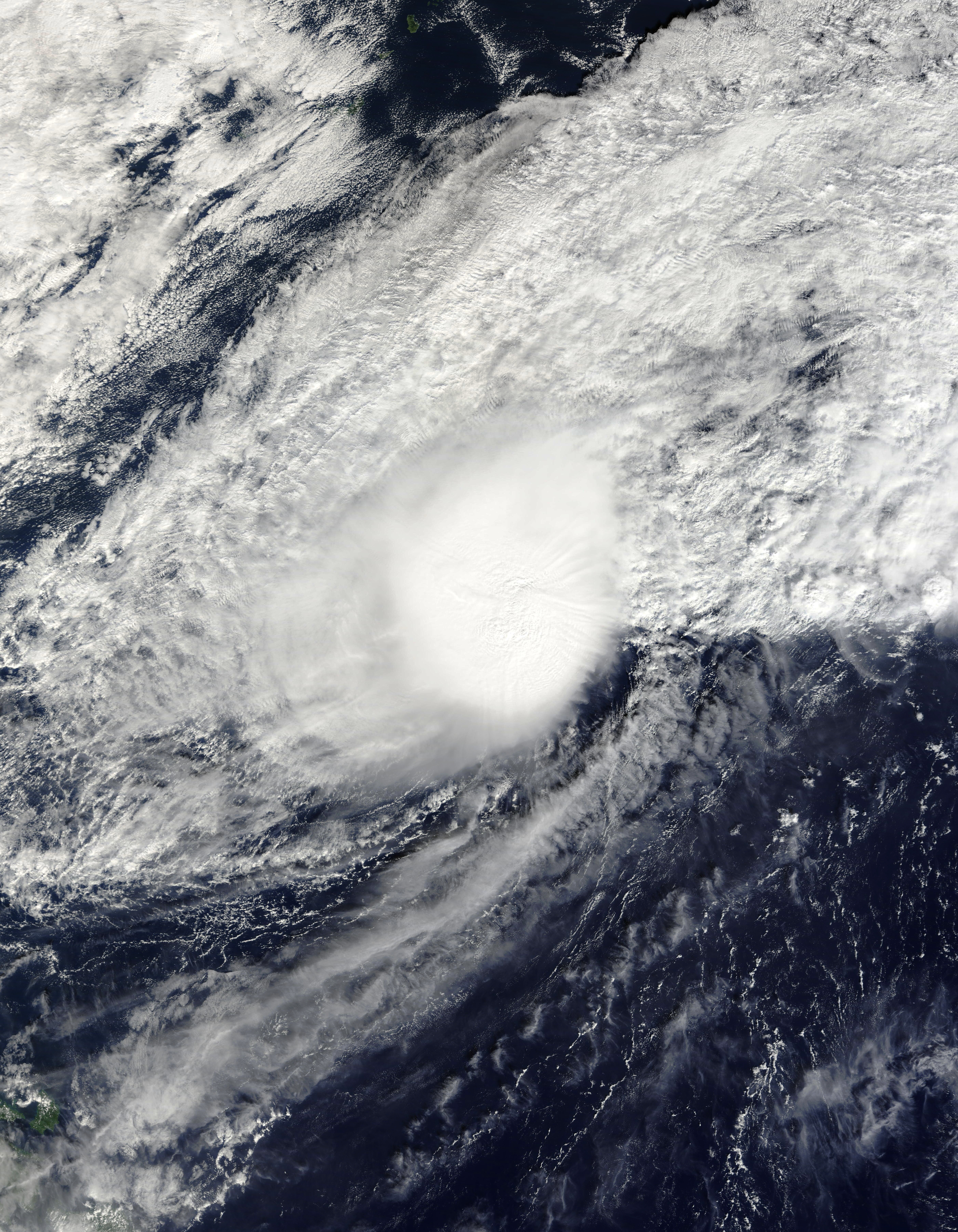
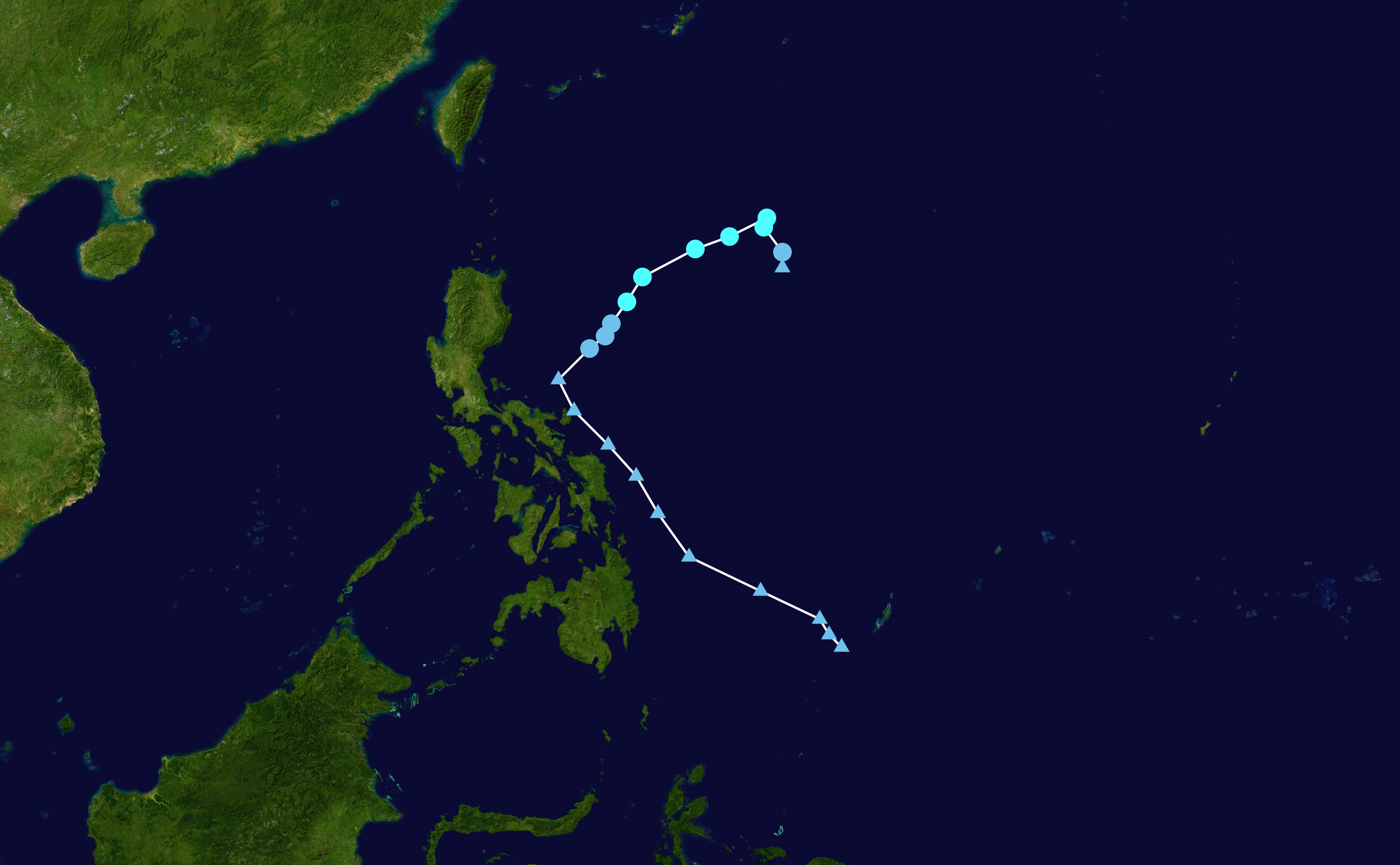
- Duration: December 10 – December 12
- Peak intensity: 75 km/h (45 mph) (10-min); 998 hPa (mbar)

An area of low pressure formed east of Mindanao within the Philippine Sea which would later be designated as an invest which would move generally northwest towards the island of Samar and east of the Visayas region. On December 9, the Low Pressure Area (LPA) was upgraded into a Tropical Depression by the Japan Meteorological Agency and be designated as 29W by the JTWC later on. As it was inside the Philippine Area of Responsibility, it was assigned the name Rosal after it was designated as a tropical depression by the Philippine Atmospheric Geophysical Astronomical Services Administration (PAGASA). Rosal's close approach to the archipelago would then prompt the raising of tropical cyclone warning signals across some parts of Bicol Region. The storm would later intensify into a tropical storm and be named "Pakhar" by the JMA. By the morning of December 12, Pakhar reached its peak intensity east of the Babuyan Islands and later weaken rapidly by wind shear in the Philippine Sea east of Extreme Northern Luzon. During the early morning hours of December 13, PAGASA would downgrade Pakhar to a remnant low east of northeastern Cagayan, dissipating due to dry air from the northeast monsoon surge, which tore apart Pakhar's circulation.

Pakhar's trough resulted in heavy rain, which indirectly resulted in 8 deaths in the province of Tanay, Rizal after a jeep was swept away by flash flooding.

=== Other systems ===
- A low-pressure area developed into a tropical depression to the northeast of Mindanao early on May 30, but quickly dissipated near Mindanao late on the same day.
- On July 22, the JMA began tracking a low pressure area off south of Japan. The following day, the JTWC also began tracking the system, now 227 nautical miles (261 mi; 420 km) south-southwest of Iwo Jima, Japan. On July 24, the JMA upgraded the system to a tropical depression.
- The JMA started to monitor a weak tropical depression that formed just west of the International Date Line on August 14 and dissipated later that day.
- A tropical depression formed far east of Japan on August 22, and dissipated the same day.
- On August 30, a tropical depression formed east of Luzon, which was given the local name Gardo by PAGASA, and classified 13W by the JTWC. The outflow from Typhoon Hinnamor exposed the circulation, and the depression was absorbed by the typhoon on September 1.
- On September 25, the JMA tracked a weak tropical depression a few hundred miles off the Japanese coast, but it dissipated on the same day.
- On November 15, a low-pressure area and the Intertropical Convergence Zone brought flooding and heavy rain to the Philippines due to the combined effects of the weather systems. Landslides were said to have occurred in some parts of the Philippines. By November 18, extreme flooding was experienced in some parts of Mindanao. The Philippine Red Cross served hot meals to 1,691 displaced people due to the effects of the flood. Localities in Cotabato have also suspended classes. At least five casualties had occurred.

== Storm names ==
Within the Northwest Pacific Ocean, both the Japan Meteorological Agency (JMA) and the Philippine Atmospheric, Geophysical and Astronomical Services Administration (PAGASA) assign names to tropical cyclones that develop in the Western Pacific, which can result in a tropical cyclone having two names. The Japan Meteorological Agency's RSMC Tokyo — Typhoon Center assigns international names to tropical cyclones on behalf of the World Meteorological Organization's Typhoon Committee, should they be judged to have 10-minute sustained wind speeds of 65 km/h (40 mph). PAGASA names to tropical cyclones which move into or form as a tropical depression in their area of responsibility located between 135°E and 115°E and between 5°N and 25°N even if the cyclone has had an international name assigned to it. The names of significant tropical cyclones will be retired by both PAGASA and the Typhoon Committee in the spring of 2023.

=== International names ===
During the season, 25 tropical storms developed in the Western Pacific and each one was named by the JMA, when the system was judged to have 10-minute sustained windspeeds of 65 kilometres per hour (40 mph). The JMA selected the names from a list of 140 names, that had been developed by the 14 members nations and territories of the ESCAP/WMO Typhoon Committee. During the season, the names Trases, Mulan, Hinnamnor, and Yamaneko were used for the first (and only, in the case of Hinnamnor) time after they replaced Sarika, Haima, Nock-ten and Hato, which were retired following the 2016 and 2017 seasons.

Malakas	Megi	Chaba	Aere	Songda	Trases	Mulan	Meari	Ma-on	Tokage	Hinnamnor	Muifa	Merbok
Nanmadol	Talas	Noru	Kulap	Roke	Sonca	Nesat	Haitang	Nalgae	Banyan	Yamaneko	Pakhar	

==== Retirement ====
At their 55th Session in March 2023, the ESCAP/WMO Typhoon Committee announced that the names Megi, Ma-on, Hinnamnor, Noru and Nalgae would be removed from the naming lists due to the number of deaths and amount of damages each one caused, and they will not be used again for another typhoon name. Additionally, the name Malakas was also retired due to its similar pronunciation to a derogatory word in Greek. In 2024, they were replaced by Amuyao, Gosari, Tsing-ma, Ong-mang, Hodu and Jamjari respectively.

=== Philippines ===
Main list
Agaton	Basyang	Caloy	Domeng	Ester
Florita	Gardo	Henry	Inday	Josie
Karding	Luis	Maymay	Neneng	Obet
Paeng	Queenie	Rosal	Samuel (unused)	Tomas (unused)
Umberto (unused)	Venus (unused)	Waldo (unused)	Yayang (unused)	Zeny (unused)
Auxiliary list
Agila (unused)	Bagwis (unused)	Chito (unused)	Diego (unused)	Elena (unused)
Felino (unused)	Gunding (unused)	Harriet (unused)	Indang (unused)	Jessa (unused)

During the season, PAGASA used its own naming scheme for the 18 tropical cyclones, that either developed within or moved into their self-defined area of responsibility. The names were taken from a list of names, that was last used during 2018 and are scheduled to be used again during 2026. All of the names are the same except Obet, Rosal and Umberto which replaced the names Ompong, Rosita and Usman after they were retired. The names Obet and Rosal were used for the first time this year.

==== Retirement ====
After the season, PAGASA announced that they removed the names Agaton, Florita, Karding and Paeng from its rotating naming lists due to the number of deaths and amount of damage they caused, and they will never be used again for another typhoon name within the Philippine Area of Responsibility (PAR). On May 5, 2023, they were replaced with Ada, Francisco, Kiyapo and Pilandok respectively.

== Season effects ==
This table summarizes all the systems that developed within or moved into the North Pacific Ocean, to the west of the International Date Line during 2022. The tables also provide an overview of a system's intensity, duration, land areas affected, and any deaths or damages associated with the system.

Name	Dates	Peak intensity			Areas affected	Damage (USD)	Deaths	Ref(s).
Name	Dates	Category	Wind speed	Pressure	Areas affected	Damage (USD)	Deaths	Ref(s).
TD	January 27–28	Tropical depression	Not specified	1006 hPa (29.71 inHg)	None	None	None	
01W	March 29–31	Tropical depression	Not specified	1006 hPa (29.71 inHg)	Vietnam	$149 million	6	
Malakas (Basyang)	April 6–15	Very strong typhoon	165 km/h (105 mph)	945 hPa (27.91 inHg)	Guam, Caroline Islands, Bonin Islands	None	None	
Megi (Agaton)	April 8–12	Tropical storm	75 km/h (45 mph)	996 hPa (29.41 inHg)	Philippines	$200 million	214	
TD	May 30	Tropical depression	Not specified	1006 hPa (29.71 inHg)	Philippines	None	None	
Chaba (Caloy)	June 28 – July 5	Typhoon	130 km/h (80 mph)	965 hPa (28.50 inHg)	Philippines, China, Vietnam	$467 million	27	
Aere (Domeng)	June 30 – July 4	Tropical storm	85 km/h (50 mph)	994 hPa (29.35 inHg)	Japan	Unknown	None	
TD	July 24–25	Tropical depression	55 km/h (35 mph)	1006 hPa (29.71 inHg)	None	None	None	
Songda	July 26 – August 1	Tropical storm	75 km/h (45 mph)	996 hPa (29.41 inHg)	Japan, South Korea, North Korea	None	None	
Trases (Ester)	July 29 – August 1	Tropical storm	65 km/h (40 mph)	998 hPa (29.47 inHg)	Ryukyu Islands, South Korea	None	None	
08W	August 3–4	Tropical depression	Not specified	1002 hPa (29.59 inHg)	South China, Vietnam	Unknown	None	
Mulan	August 8–11	Tropical storm	65 km/h (40 mph)	994 hPa (29.35 inHg)	South China, Vietnam, Laos, Thailand, Myanmar	$1.43 million	7	
Meari	August 8–14	Tropical storm	75 km/h (45 mph)	996 hPa (29.41 inHg)	Japan	Unknown	None	
TD	August 14	Tropical depression	Not specified	1012 hPa (29.88 inHg)	None	None	None	
Ma-on (Florita)	August 20–26	Severe tropical storm	100 km/h (65 mph)	985 hPa (29.09 inHg)	Philippines, South China, Vietnam	$66.6 million	7	
Tokage	August 21–25	Typhoon	140 km/h (85 mph)	970 hPa (28.64 inHg)	None	None	None	
TD	August 22	Tropical depression	55 km/h (35 mph)	1008 hPa (29.77 inHg)	None	None	None	
Hinnamnor (Henry)	August 27 –September 6	Violent typhoon	195 km/h (120 mph)	920 hPa (27.17 inHg)	Japan, Philippines, Taiwan, East China, South Korea, North Korea, Russian Far East	$1.81 billion	20	
13W (Gardo)	August 30 – September 1	Tropical depression	55 km/h (35 mph)	998 hPa (29.47 inHg)	None	None	None	
Muifa (Inday)	September 3–15	Very strong typhoon	155 km/h (100 mph)	950 hPa (28.05 inHg)	Philippines, Taiwan, Yaeyama Islands, East China	$437 million	3	
Merbok	September 10–15	Typhoon	130 km/h (80 mph)	965 hPa (28.50 inHg)	Alaska	Unknown	None	
Nanmadol (Josie)	September 12–19	Violent typhoon	195 km/h (120 mph)	910 hPa (26.87 inHg)	Japan, Korean Peninsula, Russian Far East	$2 billion	5	
Talas	September 20–23	Tropical storm	65 km/h (40 mph)	1000 hPa (29.53 inHg)	Japan	$1.38 billion	3	
Noru (Karding)	September 21–29	Very strong typhoon	175 km/h (110 mph)	940 hPa (27.76 inHg)	Philippines, Vietnam, Laos, Thailand, Cambodia	$313 million	40	
Kulap	September 25–29	Severe tropical storm	110 km/h (70 mph)	965 hPa (28.50 inHg)	None	None	None	
TD	September 25–26	Tropical depression	Not specified	1012 hPa (29.88 inHg)	None	None	None	
Roke (Luis)	September 28 – October 1	Typhoon	130 km/h (80 mph)	975 hPa (28.79 inHg)	Daitō Islands	None	None	
Maymay	October 11–12	Tropical depression	Not specified	1002 hPa (29.59 inHg)	Philippines	$9.16 million	2	
21W	October 12–14	Tropical depression	55 km/h (35 mph)	1002 hPa (29.59 inHg)	None	None	None	
Sonca	October 13–15	Tropical storm	65 km/h (40 mph)	998 hPa (29.47 inHg)	Vietnam, Laos, Cambodia	$102 million	10	
Nesat (Neneng)	October 14–20	Typhoon	140 km/h (85 mph)	965 hPa (28.50 inHg)	Philippines, Taiwan, South China, Vietnam, Cambodia, Laos	$16.7 million	None	
Haitang	October 17–19	Tropical storm	65 km/h (40 mph)	1004 hPa (29.65 inHg)	None	None	None	
25W (Obet)	October 18–23	Tropical depression	55 km/h (35 mph)	1006 hPa (29.71 inHg)	Philippines	Minimal	2	
Nalgae (Paeng)	October 26 – November 3	Severe tropical storm	110 km/h (70 mph)	975 hPa (28.79 inHg)	Philippines, Hong Kong, Macau, South China	$225 million	164	
Banyan (Queenie)	October 28 – November 3	Tropical storm	75 km/h (45 mph)	1002 hPa (29.59 inHg)	Caroline Islands, Palau, Mindanao	None	None	
Yamaneko	November 11–14	Tropical storm	65 km/h (40 mph)	1004 hPa (29.65 inHg)	None	None	None	
Pakhar (Rosal)	December 10–12	Tropical storm	75 km/h (45 mph)	998 hPa (29.47 inHg)	Philippines	None	8	
Season aggregates
37 systems	January 27 – December 12, 2022		195 km/h (120 mph)	910 hPa (26.87 inHg)		$7.17 billion	518	

== See also ==
- Weather of 2022
- Tropical cyclones in 2022
- Pacific typhoon season
- 2022 Atlantic hurricane season
- 2022 Pacific hurricane season
- 2022 North Indian Ocean cyclone season
- South-West Indian Ocean cyclone seasons: 2021–22, 2022–23
- Australian region cyclone seasons: 2021–22, 2022–23
- South Pacific cyclone seasons: 2021–22, 2022–23
