= Tropical cyclone naming =

Tables of names for tropical cyclones

Tropical cyclones and subtropical cyclones are named by various warning centers to simplify communication between forecasters and the general public regarding forecasts, watches and warnings. The names are intended to reduce confusion in the event of concurrent storms in the same basin. Once storms develop sustained wind speeds of more than 33 knots (61 km/h; 38 mph), names are generally assigned to them from predetermined lists, depending on the basin in which they originate. Some tropical depressions are named in the Western Pacific, while tropical cyclones must contain a significant amount of gale-force winds before they are named in the Southern Hemisphere.

Before it became standard practice to give personal (first) names to tropical cyclones, they were named after places, objects, or the saints' feast days on which they occurred. Credit for the first usage of personal names for weather systems is generally given to Queensland Government meteorologist Clement Wragge, who named systems between 1887 and 1907. When Wragge retired, the practice fell into disuse for several years until it was revived in the latter part of World War II for the Western Pacific. Formal naming schemes and lists have subsequently been used for major storms in the Eastern, Central, Western and Southern Pacific basins, and the Australian region, Atlantic Ocean and Indian Ocean.

== History ==
Tropical cyclone naming institutions
Basin	Institution	Area of responsibility	
Basin	Institution	Latitudes	Longitudes
Northern Hemisphere
North Atlantic	United States National Hurricane Center	Equator northward	140°W – European and African Atlantic Coasts
Eastern Pacific	United States National Hurricane Center	Equator northward	140°W – European and African Atlantic Coasts
Central Pacific	United States Central Pacific Hurricane Center	Equator northward	180° – 140°W
Western Pacific	Japan Meteorological Agency	Equator – 60°N	100°E – 180°
Western Pacific	PAGASA (unofficial)	5°N – 21°N	115°E – 135°E
North Indian Ocean	India Meteorological Department	Equator northward	40°E – 100°E
Southern Hemisphere
South-West; Indian Ocean	Mauritius Meteorological Services	Equator – 40°S	55°E – 90°E
South-West; Indian Ocean	Météo Madagascar	Equator – 40°S	African Coast – 55°E
South-West; Indian Ocean	Météo-France Reunion	Equator – 40°S	African Coast – 90°E
Australian region	Indonesian Agency for Meteorology, Climatology and Geophysics	Equator – 10°S	90°E – 141°E
Australian region	Papua New Guinea National Weather Service	Equator – 10°S	141°E – 160°E
Australian region	Australian Bureau of Meteorology	10°S – 40°S	90°E – 160°E
Southern Pacific	Fiji Meteorological Service	Equator – 25°S	160°E – 120°W
Southern Pacific	Meteorological Service of New Zealand	25°S – 40°S	160°E – 120°W
South Atlantic	Brazilian Navy Hydrographic Center (unofficial)	Equator – 35°S	Brazilian Coast – 20°W

Before the formal start of naming, tropical cyclones were often named after places, objects, or saints' feast days on which they occurred. The credit for the first usage of personal names for weather systems is generally given to the Queensland Government meteorologist Clement Wragge, who named systems between 1887 and 1907. This system of naming weather systems subsequently fell into disuse for several years after Wragge retired until it was revived in the latter part of World War II for the Western Pacific. Formal naming schemes have subsequently been introduced for the North Atlantic, Eastern, Central, Western and Southern Pacific basins as well as the Australian region and Indian Ocean.

As of 2014, tropical cyclones are officially named by one of eleven warning centers and retain their names throughout their lifetimes to facilitate the effective communication of forecasts and storm-related hazards to the general public. This is especially important when multiple storms are occurring simultaneously in the same ocean basin. Names are generally assigned in order from predetermined lists, once they produce one, three, or ten-minute sustained wind speeds of more than 65 km/h (40 mph). However, standards vary from basin to basin, with some systems named in the Western Pacific when they develop into tropical depressions or enter PAGASA's area of responsibility. Within the Southern Hemisphere, systems must be characterized by a significant amount of gale-force winds occurring around the center before they are named.

Any member of the World Meteorological Organization's hurricane, typhoon and tropical cyclone committees can request that the name of a tropical cyclone be retired or withdrawn from the various tropical cyclone naming lists. A name is retired or withdrawn if a consensus or majority of members agree that the system has acquired a special notoriety, such as causing a large number of deaths and amounts of damage, impact, or for other special reasons. A replacement name is then submitted to the committee concerned and voted upon, but these names can be rejected and replaced with another name for various reasons: these reasons include the spelling and pronunciation of the name, the similarity to the name of a recent tropical cyclone or on another list of names, and the length of the name for modern communication channels such as social media. PAGASA also retires the names of significant tropical cyclones when they have caused at least ₱1 billion (US$20.3 million) in damage or have caused at least 300 deaths.

== North Atlantic Ocean ==
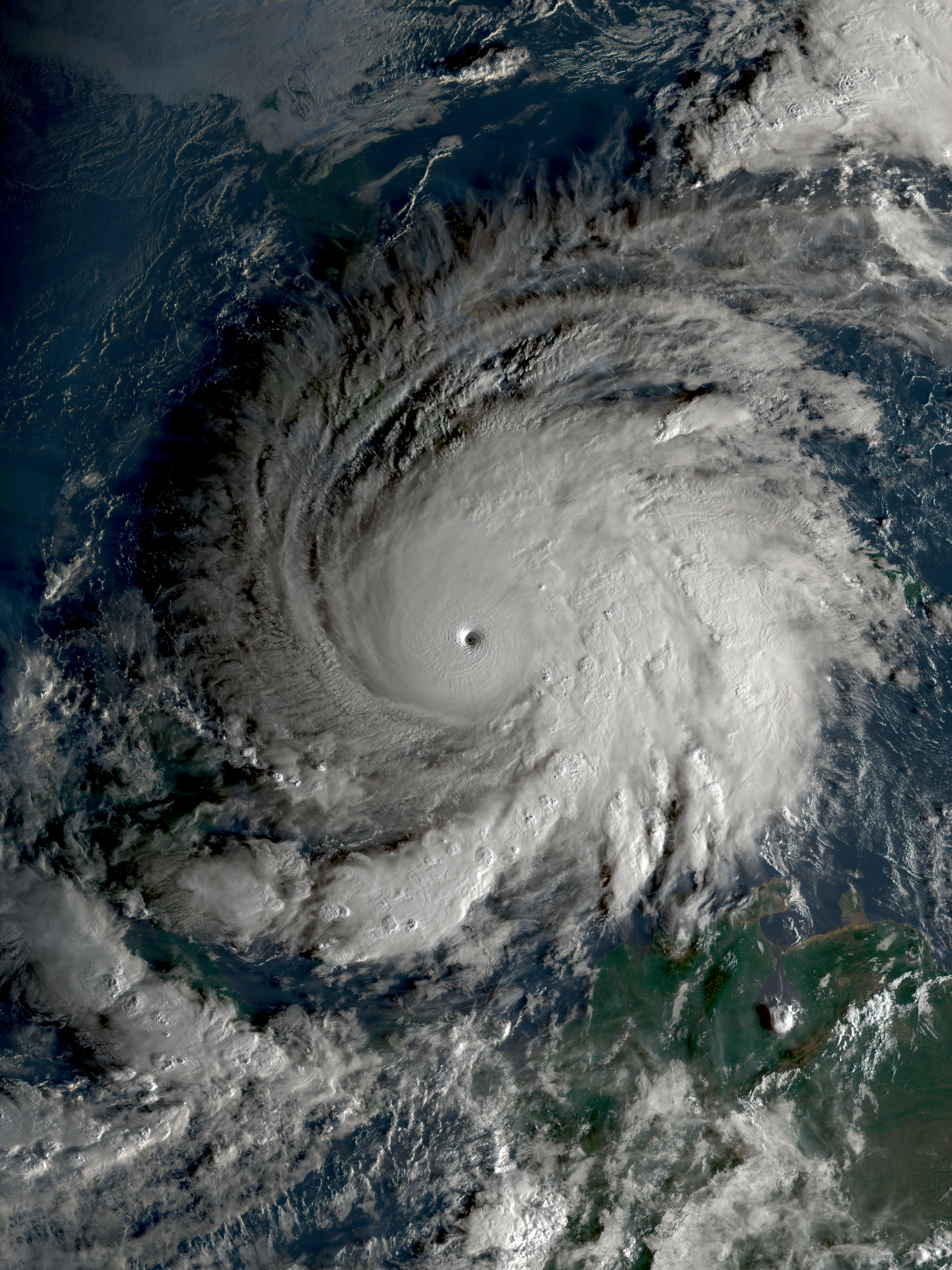
Hurricane Melissa at peak intensity just south of Jamaica in October 2025

Within the North Atlantic Basin, tropical or subtropical storms are named by the United States National Hurricane Center (NHC/RSMC Miami), when they are judged to have 1-minute sustained winds of at least 34 kn (39 mph; 63 km/h). The name selected comes from one of six rotating alphabetic lists of twenty-one names, that are maintained by the World Meteorological Organization's (WMO) RA IV Hurricane Committee. These lists skip the letters Q, U, X, Y and Z, rotate from year to year and alternate between male and female names. Should all of the names for a given year be used up, then any additional storms would be named using names from a supplemental list. The names of significant tropical cyclones are retired from the lists, with a replacement name selected at the next meeting of the Hurricane Committee.

List of Atlantic tropical cyclone names
2026 (List 6)
Names	Arthur	Bertha	Cristobal	Dolly	Edouard	Fay	Gonzalo	Hanna	Isaias	Josephine	Kyle
Names	Leah	Marco	Nana	Omar	Paulette	Rene	Sally	Teddy	Vicky	Wilfred	
2027 (List 1)
Names	Ana	Bill	Claudette	Danny	Elsa	Fred	Grace	Henri	Imani	Julian	Kate
Names	Larry	Mindy	Nicholas	Odette	Peter	Rose	Sam	Teresa	Victor	Wanda	
2028 (List 2)
Names	Alex	Bonnie	Colin	Danielle	Earl	Farrah	Gaston	Hermine	Idris	Julia	Karl
Names	Lisa	Martin	Nicole	Owen	Paula	Richard	Shary	Tobias	Virginie	Walter	
2029 (List 3)
Names	Arlene	Bret	Cindy	Don	Emily	Franklin	Gert	Harold	Idalia	Jose	Katia
Names	Lee	Margot	Nigel	Ophelia	Philippe	Rina	Sean	Tammy	Vince	Whitney	
2030 (List 4)
Names	Alberto	Brianna	Chris	Debby	Ernesto	Francine	Gordon	Holly	Isaac	Joyce	Kirk
Names	Leslie	Miguel	Nadine	Oscar	Patty	Rafael	Sara	Tony	Valerie	William	
2031 (List 5)
Names	Andrea	Barry	Chantal	Dexter	Erin	Fernand	Gabrielle	Humberto	Imelda	Jerry	Karen
Names	Lorenzo	Molly	Nestor	Olga	Pablo	Rebekah	Sebastien	Tanya	Van	Wendy	
Supplemental list
Names	Adria	Braylen	Caridad	Deshawn	Emery	Foster	Gemma	Heath	Isla	Jacobus	Kenzie
Names	Lucio	Makayla	Nolan	Orlanda	Pax	Ronin	Sophie	Tayshaun	Viviana	Will	

== Eastern and Central Pacific Ocean ==
Hurricane Polo at peak intensity while off the coast of Mexico in September 2026

Within the Eastern Pacific Ocean, there are two warning centers that assign names to tropical cyclones on behalf of the World Meteorological Organization when they are judged to have intensified into a tropical storm with winds of at least 34 kn (39 mph; 63 km/h). Tropical cyclones that intensify into tropical storms between the coast of Americas and 140°W are named by the National Hurricane Center (NHC/RSMC Miami), while tropical cyclones intensifying into tropical storms between 140°W and 180° are named by the Central Pacific Hurricane Center (CPHC/RSMC Honolulu). Significant tropical cyclones have their names retired from the lists and a replacement name selected at the next World Meteorological Organization Hurricane Committee.

=== Eastern North Pacific (east of 140°W) ===
When a tropical depression intensifies into a tropical storm to the north of the Equator between the coastline of the Americas and 140°W, it will be named by the NHC. There are six lists of names which rotate every six years and begin with the letters A—Z used, skipping Q and U, with each name alternating between a male or a female name. The names of significant tropical cyclones are retired from the lists, with a replacement name selected at the next meeting of the Hurricane Committee. If all of the names on the annual name list are used, any additional tropical or subtropical storms will receive a name from a supplemental list.

List of Eastern Pacific tropical cyclone names
2026 (List 6)
Names	Amanda	Boris	Cristina	Douglas	Elida	Fausto	Genevieve	Hernan	Iselle	Julio	Karina	Lowell
Names	Marie	Norbert	Odalys	Polo	Rachel	Simon	Trudy	Vance	Winnie	Xavier	Yolanda	Zeke
2027 (List 1)
Names	Andres	Blanca	Carlos	Dolores	Enrique	Felicia	Guillermo	Hilda	Ignacio	Jimena	Kevin	Linda
Names	Marty	Nora	Olaf	Pamela	Rick	Sandra	Terry	Vivian	Waldo	Xina	York	Zelda
2028 (List 2)
Names	Agatha	Blas	Celia	Darby	Estelle	Frank	Georgette	Howard	Ivette	Javier	Kay	Lester
Names	Madeline	Newton	Orlene	Paine	Roslyn	Seymour	Tina	Virgil	Winifred	Xavier	Yolanda	Zeke
2029 (List 3)
Names	Adrian	Beatriz	Calvin	Debora	Eugene	Fernanda	Greg	Hilary	Irwin	Jova	Kenneth	Lidia
Names	Max	Norma	Otilio	Pilar	Ramon	Selma	Todd	Veronica	Wiley	Xina	York	Zelda
2030 (List 4)
Names	Aletta	Bud	Carlotta	Daniel	Emilia	Fabio	Gilma	Hector	Ileana	Jake	Kristy	Lane
Names	Miriam	Norman	Olivia	Paul	Rosa	Sergio	Tara	Vicente	Willa	Xavier	Yolanda	Zeke
2031 (List 5)
Names	Alvin	Barbara	Cosme	Dalila	Erick	Flossie	Gil	Henriette	Ivo	Juliette	Kiko	Lorena
Names	Mario	Narda	Octave	Priscilla	Raymond	Sonia	Tico	Velma	Wallis	Xina	York	Zelda
Supplemental list
Names	Aidan	Bruna	Carmelo	Daniella	Esteban	Flor	Gerardo	Hedda	Izzy	Jacinta	Kenito	Luna
Names	Marina	Nancy	Ovidio	Pia	Rey	Skylar	Teo	Violeta	Wilfredo	Xinia	Yariel	Zoe

=== Central North Pacific Ocean (140°W to 180°) ===
Hurricane Nolo at peak intensity displaying annular characteristics southwest of Hawaii in September 2026

When a tropical depression intensifies into a tropical storm to the north of the Equator between 140°W and 180°, it is named by the CPHC. Four lists of Hawaiian names are maintained by the World Meteorological Organization's hurricane committee, rotating without regard to year, with the first name for a new year being the next name in sequence that was not used the previous year. The names of significant tropical cyclones are retired from the lists, with a replacement name selected at the next Hurricane Committee meeting.

List of Central Pacific tropical cyclone names
List	Names											
1	Akoni	Ema	Hone	Iona	Keli	Lala	Moke	Nolo	Olana	Pena	Ulana	Wale
2	Aka	Ekeka	Hene	Iolana	Keoni	Lino	Mele	Nona	Oliwa	Pama	Upana	Wene
3	Alika	Ele	Huko	Iopa	Kika	Lana	Maka	Neki	Omeka	Pewa	Unala	Wali
4	Ana	Ela	Halola	Iune	Kilo	Loke	Malia	Niala	Oho	Pali	Ulika	Walaka

== Western Pacific Ocean (180° – 100°E) ==
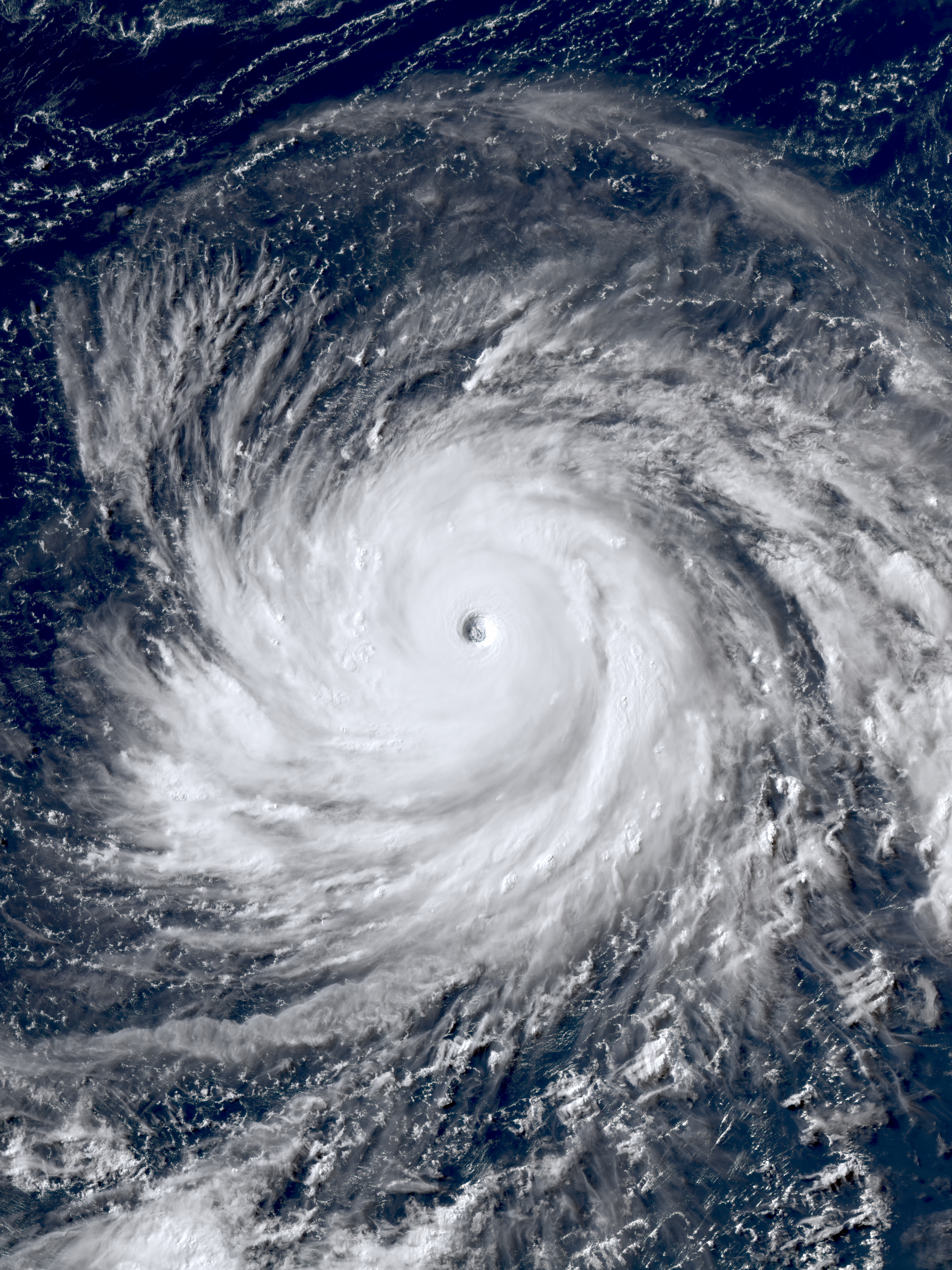
Typhoon Bavi at peak intensity just before narrowly swiping Rota in July 2026

Tropical cyclones that occur within the Northern Hemisphere between the anti-meridian and 100°E are officially named by the Japan Meteorological Agency when they become tropical storms. However, PAGASA also names tropical cyclones that occur or develop into tropical depressions within their self-defined area of responsibility between 5°N–25°N and 115°E–135°E. This often results in tropical cyclones in the region having two names.

=== International names ===
Tropical cyclones within the Western Pacific are assigned international names by the Japan Meteorological Agency when they become tropical storms with 10-minute sustained winds of at least 34 kn (39 mph; 63 km/h). The names are used sequentially without regard to year and are taken from five lists of names that were prepared by the ESCAP/WMO Typhoon Committee, after each of the 14 members submitted 10 names in 1998. The order of the names to be used was determined by placing the English name of the members in alphabetical order. Members of the committee are allowed to request the retirement or replacement of a system's name if it causes extensive destruction or for other reasons such as number of deaths.

List of Western Pacific tropical cyclone names
List	Contributing nations/regions													
List	Cambodia	China	North Korea	Hong Kong	Japan	Laos	Macau	Malaysia	Micronesia	Philippines	South Korea	Thailand	United States	Vietnam
1	Damrey	Tianma	Kirogi	Yun-yeung	Koinu	Bolaven	Sanba	Jelawat	Tirou	Maliksi	Gaemi	Prapiroon	Maria	Son-Tinh
1	Ampil	Wukong	Jongdari	Shanshan	Tomo	Leepi	Bebinca	Pulasan	Soulik	Cimaron	Narae	Burapha	Barijat	Hoaban
2	Koki	Yinxing	Gaeguri	Dim-sum	Hebi	Pabuk	Wutip	Sepat	Mun	Danas	Nari	Wipha (Note: The name Wipha was retired after the 2025 Pacific typhoon season.)	Francisco	Co-May (Note: The name Co-May was retired after the 2025 Pacific typhoon season.)
2	Krosa	Bailu	Podul	Lingling	Kajiki	Nongfa	Peipah	Tapah	Mitag (Note: The name Mitag was retired after the 2025 Pacific typhoon season.)	Ragasa (Note: The name Ragasa was retired after the 2025 Pacific typhoon season.)	Neoguri	Bualoi (Note: The name Bualoi was retired after the 2025 Pacific typhoon season.)	Matmo (Note: The name Matmo was retired after the 2025 Pacific typhoon season.)	Halong
3	Nakri	Fengshen	Kalmaegi (Note: The name Kalmaegi was retired after the 2025 Pacific typhoon season.)	Fung-wong (Note: The name Fung-wong was retired after the 2025 Pacific typhoon season.)	Koto	Nokaen	Penha	Nuri	Sinlaku	Hagupit	Jangmi	Mekkhala	Higos	Bavi
3	Maysak	Haishen	Noul	Dolphin	Kujira	Chan-hom	Peilou	Nangka	Saudel	Narra	Gaenari	Atsani	Etau	Bang-Lang
4	Krovanh	Dujuan	Surigae	Choi-wan	Koguma	Champi	In-fa	Cempaka	Nepartak	Lupit	Mirinae	Nida	Omais	Luc-Binh
4	Chanthu	Dianmu	Mindulle	Lionrock	Tokei	Namtheun	Malou	Nyatoh	Sarbul	Amuyao	Gosari	Chaba	Aere	Songda
5	Trases	Mulan	Meari	Tsing-ma	Tokage	Ong-mang	Muifa	Merbok	Nanmadol	Talas	Hodu	Kulap	Roke	Sonca
5	Nesat	Haitang	Jamjari	Banyan	Yamaneko	Pakhar	Sanvu	Mawar	Guchol	Talim	Bori	Khanun	Lan	Saobien

=== Philippines ===
Typhoon Rosal during its peak intensity in October 2026

Since 1963, PAGASA has independently operated its own naming scheme for tropical cyclones that occur within its own self-defined Philippine Area of Responsibility. The names are taken from four different lists of 25 names and are assigned when a system moves into or develops into a tropical depression within PAGASA's jurisdiction. The four lists of names are rotated every four years, with the names of significant tropical cyclones retired if they have caused at least ₱1 billion in damage and/or at least 300 deaths within the Philippines; replacements to retired names are taken from the agency's list of reserved names. If the list of names for a given year are exhausted, names are taken from an auxiliary list, the first ten of which are published every year.

List of Philippine region tropical cyclone names
2026 (Set II)
Main	Ada	Basyang	Caloy	Domeng	Ester	Francisco	Gardo	Henry	Inday	Josie	Kiyapo	Luis	Maymay
Main	Neneng	Obet	Pilandok	Queenie	Rosal	Samuel	Tomas	Umberto	Venus	Waldo	Yayang	Zeny	
Auxiliary	Agila	Bagwis	Chito	Diego	Elena	Felino	Gunding	Harriet	Indang	Jessa			
2027 (Set III)
Main	Amang	Betty	Chedeng	Dodong	Emil	Falcon	Gavino	Hanna	Ineng	Jenny	Kabayan	Liwayway	Marilyn
Main	Nimfa	Onyok	Perla	Quiel	Ramon	Sarah	Tamaraw	Ugong	Viring	Weng	Yoyoy	Zigzag	
Auxiliary	Abe	Berto	Charo	Dado	Estoy	Felion	Gening	Herman	Irma	Jaime			
2028 (Set IV)
Main	Amuyao	Butchoy	Carina	Dindo	Edring	Ferdie	Gener	Helen	Igme	Josefa	Kidul	Lekep	Marce
Main	Nanolay	Onos	Puwok	Querubin	Romina	Siony	Tonyo	Upang	Vicky	Warren	Yoyong	Zosimo	
Auxiliary	Alakdan	Baldo	Clara	Dencio	Estong	Felipe	Gomer	Heling	Ismael	Julio			
2029 (Set I)
Main	Auring	Bising	Chico	Dante	Elias	Fabian	Gorio	Huaning	Isang	Jacinto	Kiko	Lannie	Magyawan
Main	Nilad	Omar	Paolo	Quedan	Ramil	Salome	Tala	Urbano	Verbena	Wilma	Yasmin	Zoraida	
Auxiliary	Alamid	Bruno	Conching	Dolor	Ernie	Florante	Gerardo	Hernan	Isko	Jerome			

=== Japan ===
Although the Japan Meteorological Agency issues International Names (see above) for typhoons for the benefit of international press, in the local (Japanese) press, typhoons are primarily referred to by their number, for example, "Typhoon number 19" for Typhoon Hagibis, prefixed by the Japanese name of the year for typhoons occurring in previous seasons.

== North Indian Ocean (100°E – 45°E) ==
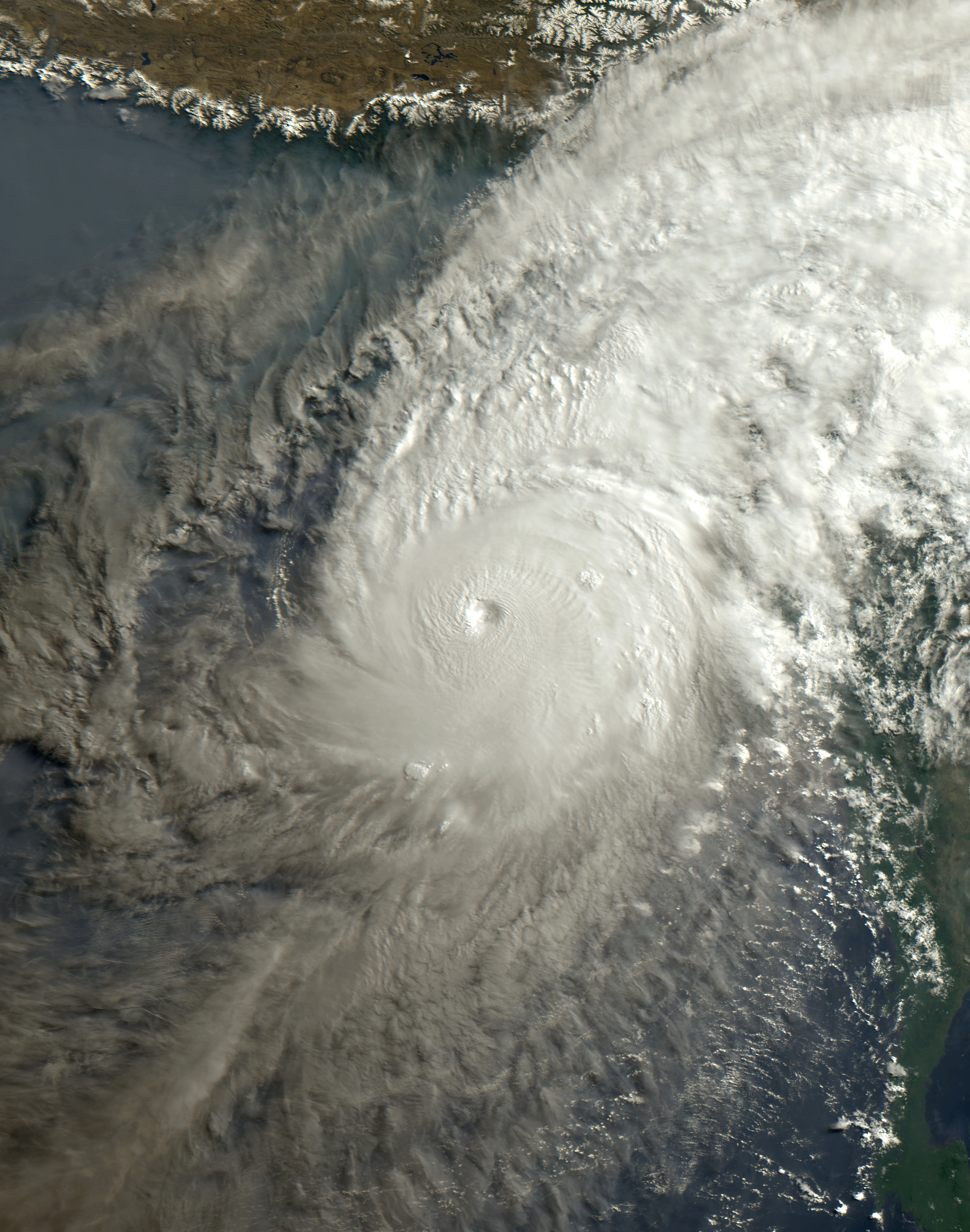
Cyclone Mocha, an Extremely Severe Cyclonic Storm equivalent to Category-5 on the SSHWS, at its peak intensity while approaching Myanmar in May 2023.

Within the North Indian Ocean between 45°E – 100°E, tropical cyclones are named by the India Meteorological Department (IMD/RSMC New Delhi) when they are judged to have intensified into cyclonic storms with 3-minute sustained wind speeds of at least 34 kn (39 mph; 63 km/h). If a cyclonic storm moves into the basin from the Western Pacific, then it will keep its original name. However, if the system weakens into a deep depression and subsequently reintensifies after moving into the region, then it will be assigned a new name.

List of North Indian Ocean tropical cyclone names (effective from 2020)
List	Contributing nation												
List	Bangladesh	India	Iran	Maldives	Myanmar	Oman	Pakistan	Qatar	Saudi Arabia	Sri Lanka	Thailand	UAE	Yemen
1	Nisarga	Gati	Nivar	Burevi	Tauktae	Yaas	Gulab	Shaheen	Jawad	Asani	Sitrang	Mandous	Mocha
2	Biparjoy	Tej	Hamoon	Midhili	Michaung	Remal	Asna	Dana	Fengal	Shakhti	Montha	Senyar	Ditwah
3	Arnab	Murasu	Akvan	Kaani	Ngamann	Sail	Sahab	Lulu	Ghazeer	Gigum	Thianyot	Afoor	Diksam
4	Upakul	Aag	Sepand	Odi	Kyarthit	Naseem	Afshan	Mouj	Asif	Gagana	Bulan	Nahhaam	Sira
5	Barshon	Vyom	Booran	Kenau	Sapakyee	Muzn	Manahil	Suhail	Sidrah	Verambha	Phutala	Quffal	Bakhur
6	Rajani	Jhar	Anahita	Endheri	Wetwun	Sadeem	Shujana	Sadaf	Hareed	Garjana	Aiyara	Daaman	Ghwyzi
7	Nishith	Probaho	Azar	Riyau	Mwaihout	Dima	Parwaz	Reem	Faid	Neeba	Saming	Deem	Hawf
8	Urmi	Neer	Pooyan	Guruva	Kywe	Manjour	Zannata	Rayhan	Kaseer	Ninnada	Kraison	Gargoor	Balhaf
9	Meghala	Prabhanjan	Arsham	Kurangi	Pinku	Rukam	Sarsar	Anbar	Nakheel	Viduli	Matcha	Khubb	Brom
10	Samiron	Ghurni	Hengame	Kuredhi	Yinkaung	Watad	Badban	Oud	Haboob	Ogha	Mahingsa	Degl	Shuqra
11	Pratikul	Ambud	Savas	Horangu	Linyone	Al-jarz	Sarrab	Bahar	Bareq	Salitha	Phraewa	Athmad	Fartak
12	Sarobor	Jaladhi	Tahamtan	Thundi	Kyeekan	Rabab	Gulnar	Seef	Alreem	Rivi	Asuri	Boom	Darsah
13	Mahanisha	Vega	Toofan	Faana	Bautphat	Raad	Waseq	Fanar	Wabil	Rudu	Thara	Saffar	Samhah

== South-West Indian Ocean (west of 90°E) ==
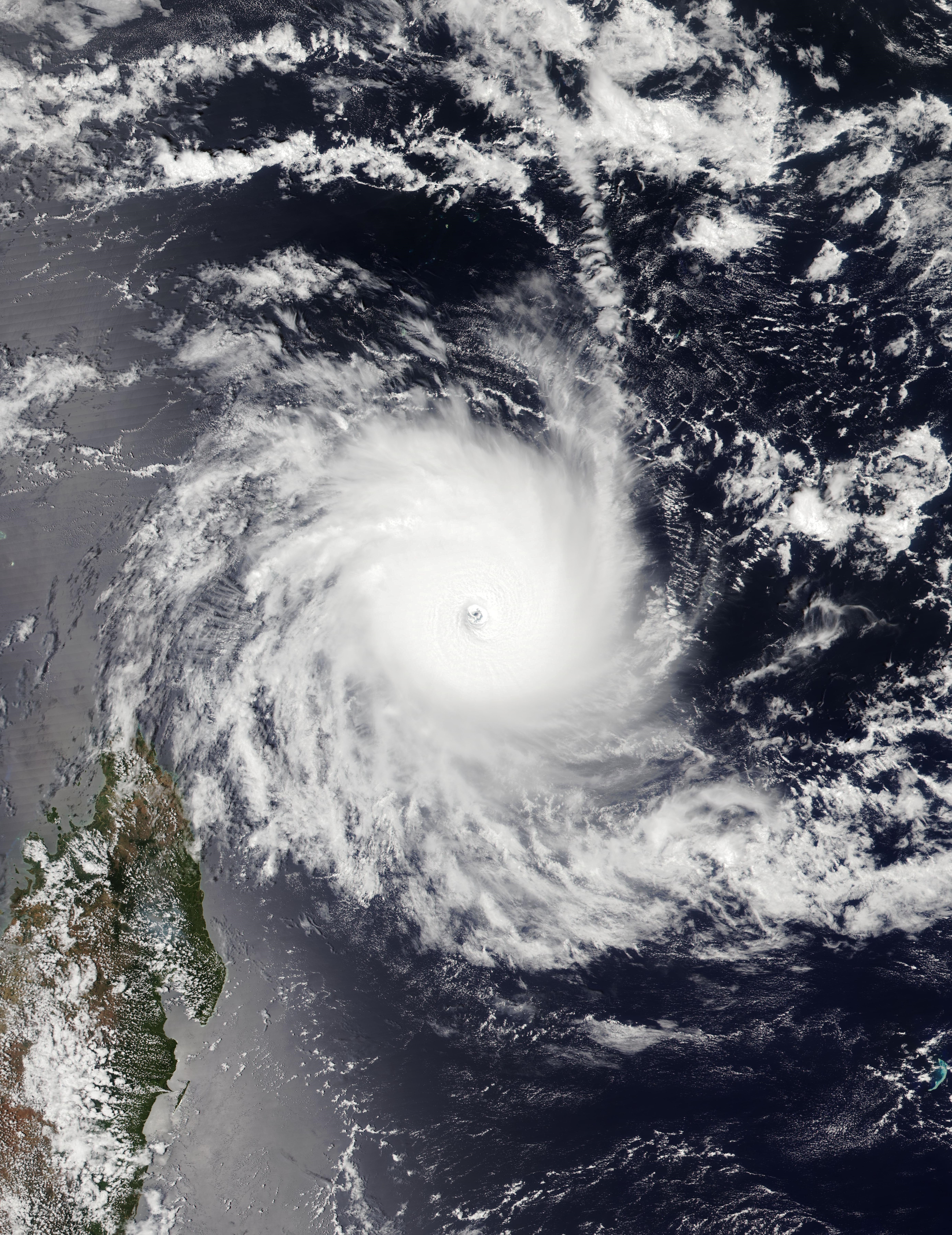
Cyclone Chido near peak intensity northeast of Madagascar in December 2024

Within the South-West Indian Ocean in the Southern Hemisphere between Africa and 90°E, a tropical or subtropical disturbance is named when it is judged to have intensified into a tropical storm with winds of at least 34 kn (39 mph; 63 km/h). This is defined as being when gales are either observed or estimated to be present near a significant portion of the system's center. Systems are named in conjunction with Météo-France Reunion by either Météo Madagascar or the Mauritius Meteorological Service. If a disturbance reaches the naming stage between Africa and 55°E, then Météo Madagascar names it; if it reaches the naming stage between 55°E and 90°E, then the Mauritius Meteorological Service names it. The names are taken from three pre-determined lists of names, which rotate on a triennial basis, with any names that have been used automatically removed. These names are then replaced by the WMO's RA I Tropical Cyclone Committee, with names submitted by member nations.

List of South–West Indian Ocean tropical cyclone names
2025–26
Names	Awo	Blossom	Chenge	Dudzai	Ewetse	Fytia	Gezani	Horacio	Indusa	Juluka	Kundai	Lisebo	Michel
Names	Nousra	Olivier	Pokera	Quincy	Rebaone	Salama	Tristan	Ursula	Violet	Wilson	Xila	Yekela	Zaina
2026–27
Names	Agueda	Bertrand	Celiwe	Dira	Emmie	Fikri	Gumbo	Hisna	Isaura	Jeremy	Kanga	Ludzi	Melina
Names	Noah	Onias	Pitsana	Quamar	Rita	Solani	Tarik	Urilia	Vuyane	Wafula	Xusa	Yarona	Zacarias
2027–28
Names	Ainga	Basil	Cassia	Deba	Etienne	Fatuma	Gori	Henning	Itai	Josha	Kalulu	Letlama	Maipelo
Names	Njazi	Oscar	Pamela	Quentin	Rouma	Soary	Themba	Uyapo	Viviane	Walter	Xavier	Yemurai	Zanele

== Australian region (90°E – 160°E) ==
Within the Australian region in the Southern Hemisphere between 90°E – 160°E, a tropical cyclone is named when observations or Dvorak intensity analysis indicate that a system has gale force or stronger winds near the center which are forecast to continue. The Indonesian Badan Meteorologi, Klimatologi, dan Geofisika names systems that develop between the Equator and 10°S and 90°E and 141°E, while Papua New Guinea's National Weather Service names systems that develop between the Equator and 10°S and 141°E and 160°E. Outside of these areas, the Australian Bureau of Meteorology names systems that develop into tropical cyclones. In order to enable local authorities and their communities in taking action to reduce the impact of a tropical cyclone, each of these warning centres reserve the right to name a system early if it has a high chance of being named. If a name is assigned to a tropical cyclone that causes loss of life or significant damage and disruption to the way of life of a community, then the name assigned to that storm is retired from the list of names for the region. A replacement name is then submitted to the next World Meteorological Organization's RA V Tropical Cyclone Committee meeting.

=== Indonesia ===
If a system intensifies into a tropical cyclone between the Equator – 10°S and 90°E – 141°E, it will be named by the Badan Meteorologi, Klimatologi, dan Geofisika (BMKG/TCWC Jakarta). Names are assigned in sequence from list A, while list B details names that will replace names on list A that are retired or removed for other reasons.

List of Indonesian tropical cyclone names
List A
Anggrek	Bakung	Cempaka	Dahlia	Flamboyan	Kenanga	Lili	Melati	Rambutan	Teratai
List B
Anggur	Belimbing	Duku	Jambu	Lengkeng	Manggis	Nanas	Pepaya	Terong	Sawo

=== Papua New Guinea ===
If a system intensifies into a tropical cyclone between the Equator – 10°S and 141°E – 160°E, then it will be named by Papua New Guinea National Weather Service (NWS, TCWC Port Moresby). Names are assigned in sequence from list A and are automatically retired after being used regardless of any damage caused. List B contains names that will replace names on list A that are retired or removed for other reasons.

List of Papua New Guinea tropical cyclone names
List A
Alu	Buri	Emau	Fere	Hibu	Ila	Kama	Lobu	Nou	Paia
List B
Auram	Malai	Obaha	Penua	Ranu	Sabi	Tau	Ume	Vali	Wau

=== Australia ===
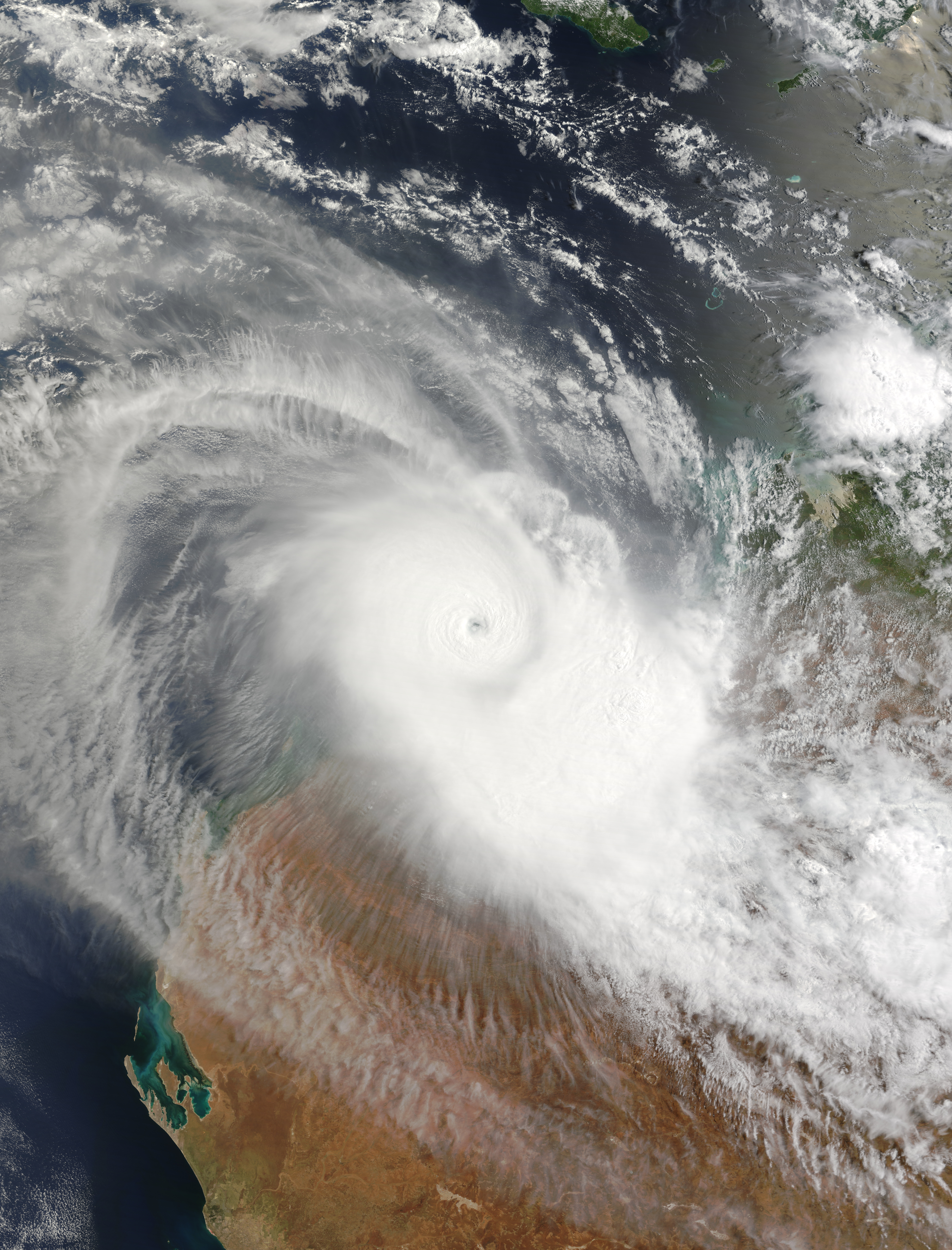
Cyclone Zelia at peak intensity approaching Western Australia in February 2025

When a system develops into a tropical cyclone below 10°S between 90°E and 160°E, then it will be named by the Australian Bureau of Meteorology (BOM/TCWC Melbourne). The names are assigned in alphabetical order and used in rotating order without regard to year.

List of Australian tropical cyclone names
List A
Names	Anika	Billy	Charlotte	Darian	Ellie	Frederic	Gemm	Herman	Isabella	Julian	Kima
Names	Lincoln	Merryn	Neville	Olga	Paul	Robyn	Sean	Taliah	Vince	Zhu	—N/a
List B
Names	Akio	Bianca	Courtney	Dianne	Errol	Freya	Grant	Hayley	Iggy	Jenna	Koji
Names	Luana	Mitchell	Nikita	Owen	Peta	Riordan	Sandra	Tim	Victoria	Zane	—N/a
List C
Names	Alessia	Bruce	Catherine	Dylan	Edna	Fletcher	Gillian	Hadi	Ivana	Jack	Kate
Names	Laszlo	Mingzhu	Nathan	Oriana	Quincey	Raquel	Stan	Tatiana	Uriah	Yvette	—N/a
List D
Names	Anthony	Blanche	Caleb	Dara	Ernie	Frances	Greg	Hilda	Irving	Joyce	Kelvin
Names	Linda	Marco	Nora	Oran	Penny	Riley	Savannah	Trung	Verity	Wallace	—N/a
List E
Names	Amber	Blake	Claudia	Declan	Esther	Ferdinand	Gretel	Heath	Imogen	Joshua	Kimi
Names	Lucas	Marian	Niran	Odette	Paddy	Ruby	Stafford	Tiffany	Vernon	—N/a	—N/a

== Southern Pacific Ocean (160°E – 120°W) ==
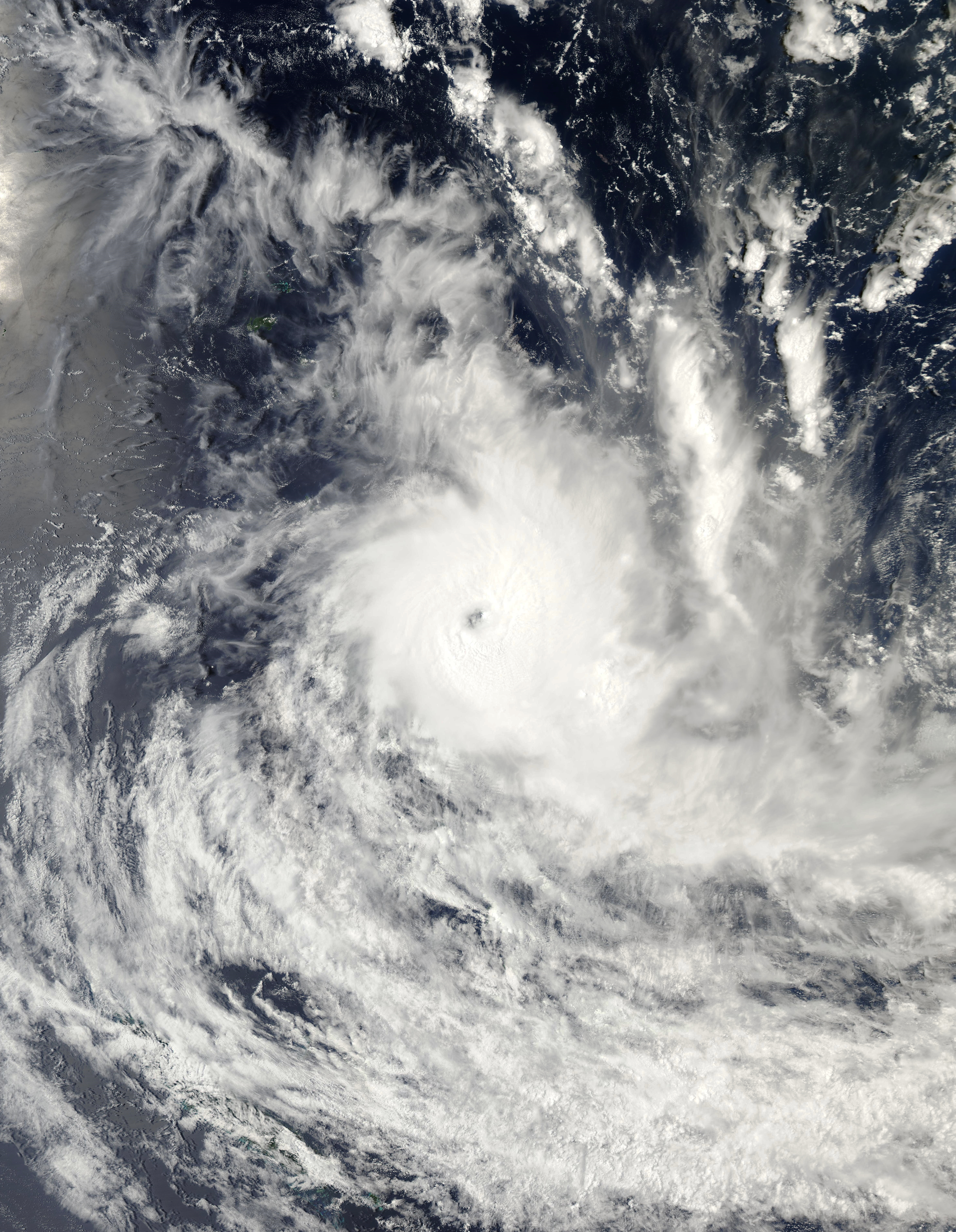
Cyclone Lola at peak intensity in October 2023

Within the Southern Pacific basin in the Southern Hemisphere between 160°E – 120°W, a tropical cyclone is named when observations or Dvorak intensity analysis indicate that a system has gale force or stronger winds near the centre which are forecast to continue. The Fiji Meteorological Service (FMS) names systems that are located between the Equator and 25°S, while the New Zealand MetService names systems (in conjunction with the FMS) that develop to the south of 25°S. In order to enable local authorities and their communities in taking action to reduce the impact of a tropical cyclone, the FMS reserves the right to name a system early if it has a high chance of being named. If a tropical cyclone causes loss of life or significant damage and disruption to the way of life of a community, then the name assigned to that cyclone is retired from the list of names for the region. A replacement name is then submitted to the next World Meteorological Organization's RA V Tropical Cyclone Committee meeting. The name of a tropical cyclone is determined by using Lists A–D in order, without regard to the year before restarting with List A. List E contains names that will replace names on Lists A–D when needed.

List of South Pacific tropical cyclone names
List A
Names	Aru	Bina	Carol	Dovi	Eva	Fili	Gina	Hale	Irene	Josese	Kirio	Lute	Mata
Names	Nat	Osai	Pita	Rex	Seru	Tam	Urmil	Velma	Wati	Xavier	Yani	Zita	
List B
Names	Arthur	Becky	Chip	Denia	Elisa	Fotu	Glen	Hettie	Innis	Julie	Ken	Lin	Maciu
Names	Nisha	Orea	Palu	Rene	Sarah	Troy	Uinita	Vanessa	Wano	—N/a	Yvonne	Zaka	
List C
Names	Alvin	Bune	Cyril	Danial	Eden	Florin	Garry	Haley	Isa	June	Kofi	Louise	Mike
Names	Niko	Opeti	Perry	Reuben	Solo	Tuni	Ulu	Victor	Wanita	—N/a	Yates	Zidane	
List D
Names	Amos	Bart	Crystal	Dean	Ella	Fehi	Garth	Hola	Iris	Jo	Kala	Liua	Mona
Names	Neil	Oma	Pana	Rita	Samadiyo	Tasi	Uesi	Vicky	Wasi	—N/a	Yabaki	Zazu	
List E (Standby)
Names	Adama	Ben	Christy	Dakai	Emosi	Feki	Germaine	Hart	Ili	Junina	Kosi	Lia	Manoah
Names	Neta	Olina	Paea	Rovi	Sete	Temo	Uila	Vaea	Wane	—N/a	Yavala	Zanna	

== South Atlantic Ocean ==
When a tropical or subtropical storm exists in the South Atlantic Ocean, the Brazilian Navy Hydrographic Center's Marine Meteorological Service names the system using a predetermined list of names. The names are assigned in alphabetical order and used in rotating order without regard to year. The name "Kurumí" replaced "Kamby" in 2018 without the latter being used. In 2022, 32 new names were added.

List of South Atlantic tropical cyclone names
Names	Arani	Bapo	Cari	Deni	Eçaí	Guará	Iba	Jaguar	Kurumí	Mani	Oquira	Potira	Raoni	—N/a	—N/a	Ubá	Yakecan
Names	Akará	Biguá	Caiobá	—N/a	Endy	Guarani	Iguaçú	Jaci	Kaeté	Maracá	Okanga	Poti	Reri	Sumé	Tupã	Upaba	Ybatinga
Names	Aratu	Buri	Caiçara	—N/a	Esapé	Guaí	Itã	Juru	Katu	Murici	Oryba	Peri	Reia	Samburá	Taubaté	Uruana	Ytu

== See also ==
- Tropical cyclone scales
- Atlantic hurricane season
- South Atlantic tropical cyclone
- Pacific hurricane season
- Pacific typhoon season
- South Pacific tropical cyclone
- North Indian Ocean tropical cyclone
- South-West Indian Ocean tropical cyclone
- Australian region tropical cyclone
- Regional Specialized Meteorological Center
- Weather system naming in Europe
