= Halong =

Halong may refer to:

- Ha Long, also known as Hong Gai, the capital city of Quang Ninh Province, Vietnam
- Halong Bay, a UNESCO World Heritage site located in Quang Ninh province, Vietnam
- Halong naval base, an Indonesian Navy (previously Dutch) facility on the island of Ambon
- Typhoon Halong, a pacific typhoon name.
