= Bolaven =

Bolaven may refer to:

- Bolaven Plateau, elevated region in southern Laos
- Typhoon Bolaven (disambiguation)
