= Tropical Storm Talas (2011) =

Pacific severe tropical storm in 2011

Severe Tropical Storm Talas
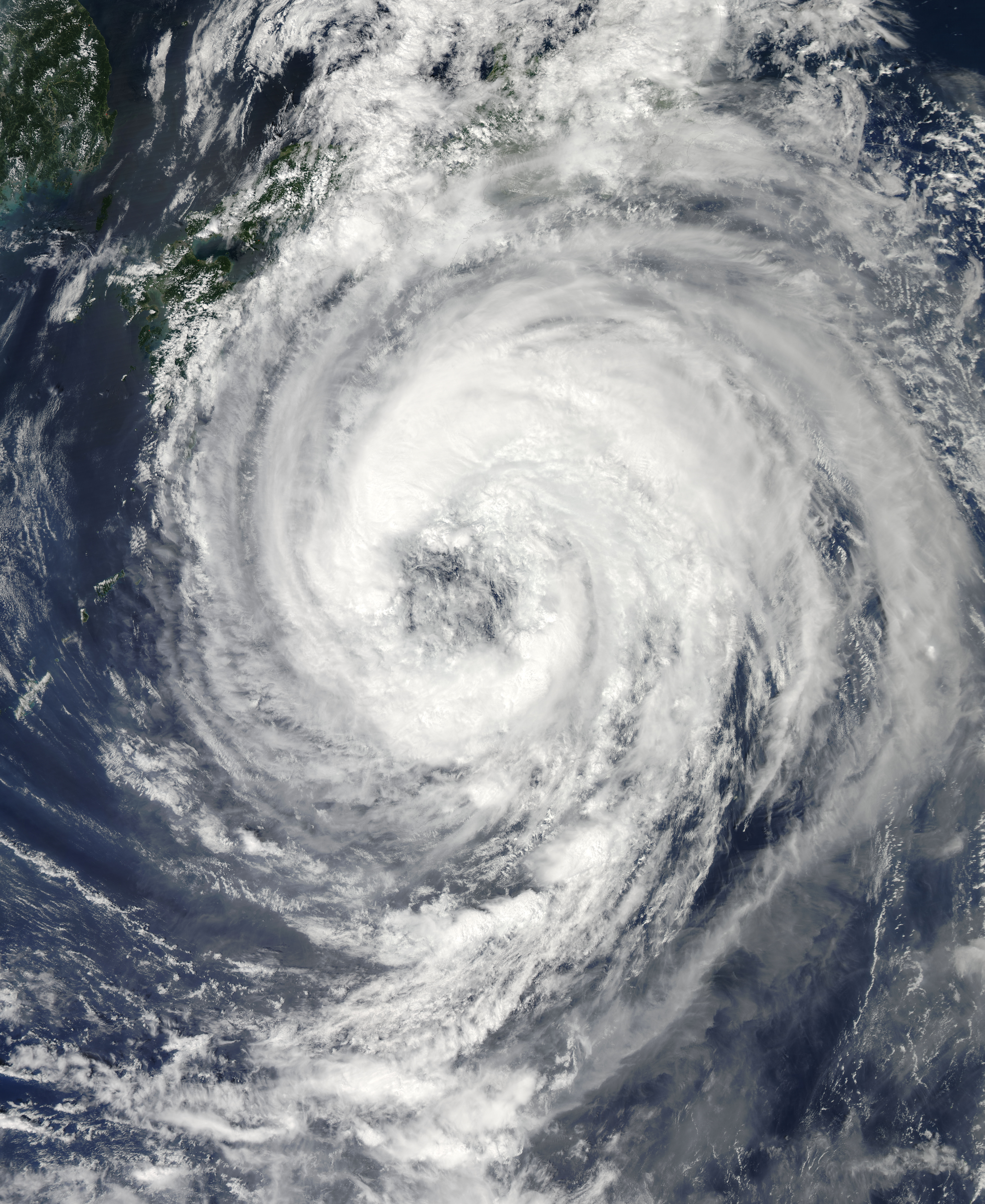
- Severe Tropical Storm Talas at peak intensity on September 1, 2011

Meteorological history
- Formed: August 23, 2011
- Extratropical: September 5, 2011
- Dissipated: September 7, 2011

Severe tropical storm
- 10-minute sustained (JMA)
- Highest winds: 95 km/h (60 mph)
- Lowest pressure: 970 hPa (mbar); 28.64 inHg

Tropical storm
- 1-minute sustained (SSHWS/JTWC)
- Highest winds: 100 km/h (65 mph)
- Lowest pressure: 982 hPa (mbar); 29.00 inHg

Overall effects
- Fatalities: 82
- Missing: 16
- Damage: $600 million (2011 USD)
- Areas affected: Japan
- IBTrACS /
- Part of the 2011 Pacific typhoon season

Severe Tropical Storm Talas (formerly called Typhoon Talas), (Note: The name Talas (Tagalog: talas, [ˈtaː.lɐs]) was contributed by the Philippines and means "sharpness, acuteness" in Tagalog.) was an unusually large tropical cyclone that caused severe damage and deadliest typhoon to hit Japan since Typhoon Etau in 2009. It was the 12th named storm and the 7th severe tropical storm of the 2011 Pacific typhoon season. Talas is known to have killed at least 82 people, and 16 more are still missing. It followed five months after Japan was hit by a large tsunami.

Throughout Japan, Talas brought heavy rainfall leaving roads flooded. Extremely heavy rainfall of 66.5 millimeters per hour was observed, with rainfall of 69.0 mm in Yamanakako, Yamanashi, and 49.5 mm in Ichinoseki, Iwate which exceeded overall records for the entire month of September. Some 3,200 people were evacuated in 16 prefectures after extremely heavy rain. Some 700 houses were completely inundated by floods in eastern and western Japan and about 9,500 households in nine prefectures across the nation suffered power outages. More than 400 flights were cancelled leaving approximately 34,000 stranded.

In post-analysis, the Japan Meteorological Agency (JMA) downgraded Talas from a minimal typhoon to a severe tropical storm.

== Meteorological history ==
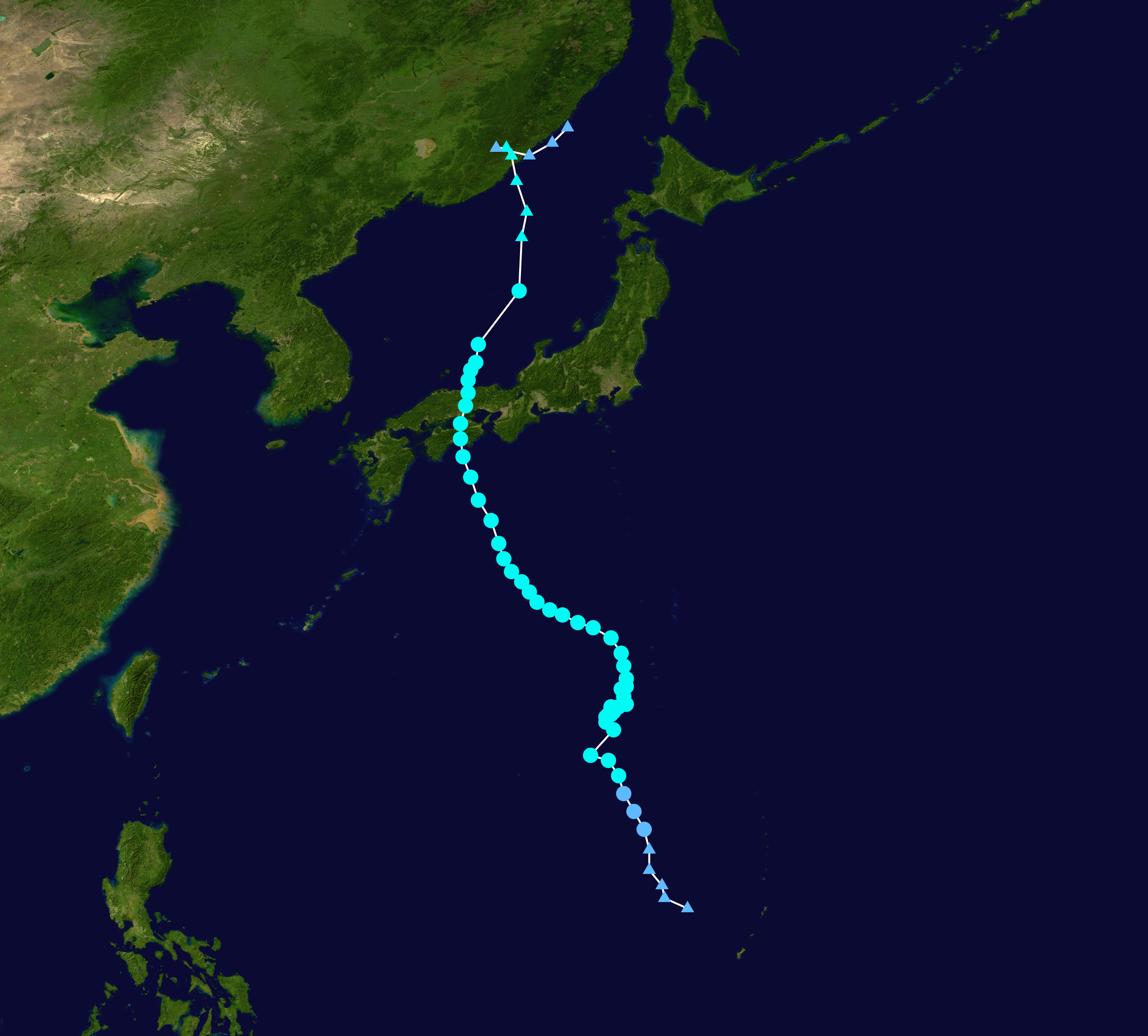
Map plotting the storm's track and intensity, according to the Saffir–Simpson scale Map key Saffir–Simpson scale Tropical depression (≤38 mph, ≤62 km/h) Tropical storm (39–73 mph, 63–118 km/h) Category 1 (74–95 mph, 119–153 km/h) Category 2 (96–110 mph, 154–177 km/h) Category 3 (111–129 mph, 178–208 km/h) Category 4 (130–156 mph, 209–251 km/h) Category 5 (≥157 mph, ≥252 km/h) Unknown Storm type Tropical cyclone Subtropical cyclone Extratropical cyclone, remnant low, tropical disturbance, or monsoon depression

Late on August 22, an area of low pressure developed to the west of Guam. At midnight that day, the system became sufficiently well organized that the Japan Meteorological Agency (JMA) started tracking it as a tropical depression. On August 23, the system moved into an environment of low wind shear and warm sea surface temperatures prompting the JTWC to issue a Tropical Cyclone Formation Alert (TCFA) on it. By August 25, the system grew strong enough that the JMA upgraded it to a tropical storm, naming it Talas. Soon the system developed long and expansive convective banding along the eastern and south-western periphery of the broad low level circulation center, similar to a monsoonal depression. The JTWC initiated advisories on the system, designating it with 15W. The JTWC originally anticipated a fujiwhara effect of Typhoon Nanmadol, a stronger tropical cyclone to the west of Talas.

However, the two cyclones moved far away from each other with at least 1,000 nautical miles (1,900 km; 1,200 mi) of distance between them. This prompted the JTWC to change its forecast on the system, from turning west and interacting with Nanmadol, to continuously move north and intensify into a typhoon. This prompted the JMA to upgrade Talas to a severe tropical storm with winds of 50 knots (95 km/h; 60 mph). Multiple competitive steering ridges caused Talas to move in a poleward direction with stronger winds in the periphery and weaker winds near the center. A tropical upper tropospheric trough (TUTT) caused subsidance in the atmosphere which caused a disturbance in the outflow towards the northwest of the system. However, another TUTT cell to the northeast opened an outflow channel which kept Talas from being destroyed by shear. Talas was very loosely organized with a relatively open circulation center and very low consolidation around the core. Convection was also displaced towards the periphery and stronger wind shear kept Talas from strengthening.

Talas, being located in a very weak steering environment hardly moved in 24 hours and was effectively trapped between strong subtropical ridges and an anticyclone. Talas failed to strengthen for a very long time and remained loosely organized with all the convection located in the periphery. Early on August 28, Talas started to strengthen after a whole day in dry winds. The low-level circulation center started to get consolidated with deep convective bands wrapping into it. Talas was expected to make landfall over central Japan with strong winds. Talas then moved into an environment favorable for slow development, with moist winds and significantly warm sea surface temperatures. The center became well organized with convective bands tightly wrapped into it. Wind shear decreased and the center was wrapped with more tightly curved banding. The JTWC reported that there was more confidence in the strength and position of the system. They JTWC reported that they were expecting a peak intensity of 90 knots (165 km/h; 105 mph).

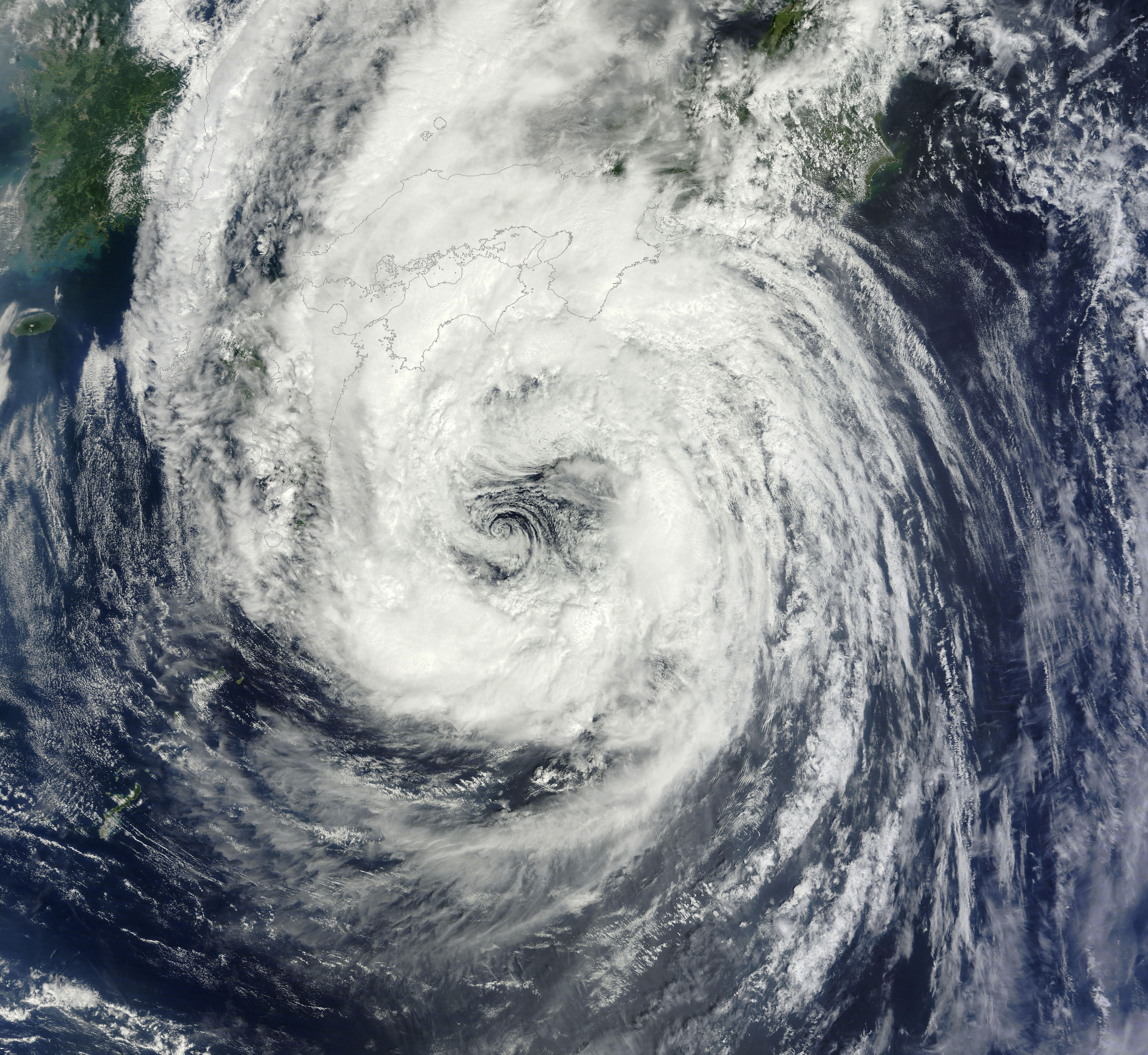
Severe Tropical Storm Talas approaching Japan on September 2

Soon, the subtropical ridge to the west of the storm weakened and the subtropical ridge to the east of the system pushed Talas to the west. As a result, Talas accelerated towards the west maintaining strength and outflow. An upper-level cyclone over the system suppressed the convection and kept it from reaching the center. Therefore, Talas remained weak and did not strengthen further. Convection never managed to consolidate the center and convective banding remained well away from the fully exposed low-level circulation center. Convective banding completely encircled the LLCC but never managed to consolidate over the LLCC because of the strong upper-lever cyclone over the storm. Talas was being steered by a mid-level anticyclone, a part of the developing omega block. On September 1, Talas developed a large annulus of nearly 110 nautical miles (205 km; 125 mi) in diameter with multiple weak circulations cyclonically rotating around a centroid within the center. Fragmented deep convective banding broadly wrapped the low-level circulation center with an upper-level cyclone over the center and anticyclonic flow around the periphery of the storm.

Soon, Talas turned towards the Kansai region of Japan maintaining intensity with cloud tops warming around the expansive, nearly cloud-free 140 nautical miles (260 km; 160 mi) wide low level circulation center (LLCC). Gale-force winds were extending to over 200 nautical miles (370 km; 230 mi) towards the north. The convective banding continued to expand more and more with the outer rainbands already brushing parts of Japan. Coastal areas in the nation have already reported gale-force winds several hours before landfall, while the Omega block continued to drive Talas towards the nation. Land interaction weakened Talas, prompting the JMA to downgrade Talas from a typhoon to a severe tropical storm with winds of under 60 knots (110 km/h; 70 mph).

On September 2, Talas accelerated towards Japan and started making landfall over Kōchi Prefecture, Japan. As a result, convective cloud tops started to warm up and banding became more fragmented. Talas maintained its large annulus with better poleward outflow enhanced by the strong mid latitude westerlies. After making landfall over Aki, Japan early on September 3, Talas moved into an area of moderate wind shear (15–20 knots) along the western edge of a deep-layered subtropical ridge with a mid-latitude trough approaching from the northwest. As a result, the LLCC started weakening and slowed down over land. Also, the mid-latitude trough located to the northwest of the system started to weaken, which made the JTWC anticipate Talas to turn northwestward and accelerate as it enters the Sea of Japan. However, Talas slowly drifted north and entered an area of strong wind shear (30–50 knots). On becoming exposed to wind shear and strong upper-level westerlies, Talas became grossly elongated to the northeast and convective banding became more shallow and fragmented. On entering the cold waters of the Sea of Japan, Talas accelerated north at over 13 knots (24 km/h; 15 mph). The central convection became significantly eroded and was displaced to the north-east as Talas was exposed to a very strong wind shear of over 50 knots (95 km/h; 60 mph) that made the LLCC very distorted and difficult to pin-point. Talas was embedded in a baroclinic zone and the JTWC anticipated an extratropical transition, which prompted them to issue their final warning on the system. On September 5, the JMA issued their final warning on the system, reporting that Talas had become extratropical over the Sea of Japan.

== Preparations ==
As the storm strengthened into a severe tropical storm (typhoon operationally), the residents of Tokyo, Japan were informed to stay updated and stock up for Talas. Heavy rains and strong winds which could trigger flash flooding and landslides were expected. Also, a strong rainstorm of 50 millimetres (2.0 in) – 70 millimetres (2.8 in) per hour was expected. Talas was expected to cause rainfall and strong winds for an unusually long period of time because of its slow movement. Worries grew as the typhoon was heading towards the area which was previously devastated by the 2011 Tōhoku earthquake and tsunami. Parts of Tohoku where the tsunami occurred are still in ruins.

== Impact ==
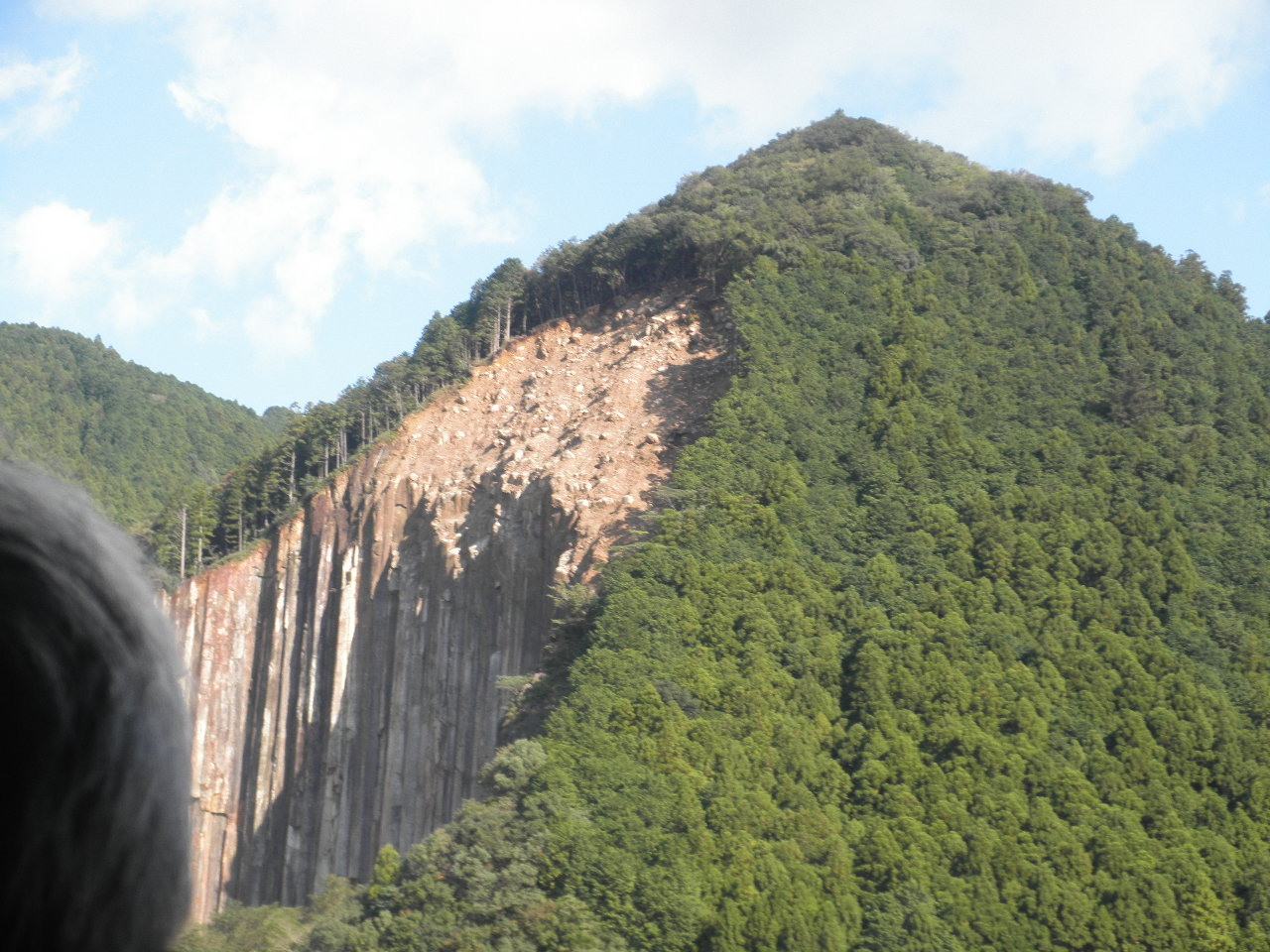
The heavy rains from Talas triggered numerous landslides, such as this one in Kihō, across the mountainous terrain of Japan.

Talas slowed down on approaching Japan, bringing heavy rainfall to the southern coast. In Shunan, Yamaguchi, extremely heavy rainfall of 66.5 millimeters per hour was observed, with rainfall of 69.0 mm in Yamanakako, Yamanashi, and 49.5 mm in Ichinoseki, Iwate which exceeded overall records for the entire month of September. As the typhoon approached, The Fujisankei Classic, an annual golf event on the Japan Golf Tour was disrupted by the heavy rain. Heavy rains triggered flash flooding, which killed one person, and injured 17 leaving three more missing soon after the landfall. Some 3,200 people were evacuated in 16 prefectures after the typhoon slammed the island nation with extremely heavy rains. The Central Japan Railway Company had to suspend its bullet train services on the Tokaido Shinkansen Line between Gifu-Hashima and Maibara railway stations because of the storm. More than 300 houses were flooded while several landslides were reported since the storm's landfall in southern Japan. Also, since the storm was moving unusually slow, it worsened the condition. NHK confirmed that the number of dead was 27, the number of injured was 106 and the number of missing was 49.

Some 700 houses were completely inundated by the floodwaters spawned by Talas in eastern and western Japan and about 9,500 households in nine prefectures across the nation were without power after power outages. More than 400 flights were cancelled leaving some 34,000 stranded. Most of the devastation occurred in Osaka, where a flooded river washed away two complete houses and a landslide destroyed four houses. Extremely heavy rainfall of as high as 170 centimetres (67 in) was dumped over Osaka since Talas approached Japan. The heavy rainfall triggered obvious flooding in the rivers, but so extreme that an entire bridge was washed away.

I have to think about how to help the people of the town deal with this disaster. Only after that can I think about my family. I hope that I can find my wife soon to send off my family with my daughter.

— Mayor, Nachikatsuura, Wakayama

Talas poured record rainfall across the nation stranding thousands, turning towns into lakes and washed away cars, setting off mudslides. The storm also damaged the Nijō Castle, a flatland castle located in Kyoto, Japan. On September 5, Japanese rescue workers started digging through the debris to look for the missing since the number of missing is unusually high. Death toll continued to rise after the intense mudslides and flooding triggered by Talas. CNN reported that local authorities raised the death toll to 29 and the number of missing to 56. The Japanese government started an emergency search-and-rescue operation to begin reconstruction of damaged communities and to find those missing. Ever since the typhoon approached land, Talas continuously dumped heavy rain over the Wakayama, Nara and Mie prefectures turning a large portion of the area to swamps. More than 750 Self-Defense Forces have been deployed in order to help local police and firefighters with the rescue and search operations. Talas broke a record of 1,322 millimetres (52.0 in) rainfall that fell on the southern town of Takachiho in Miyazaki Prefecture in September 2005. Talas's rainfall also exceeded the year round average of rainfall that falls over the city of Tokyo. Most of the deaths were reported in Wakayama Prefecture where at least 17 people are reported to have been killed. The typhoon caused most of the substantial damage in the Kii Peninsula, that is located just a few hundreds of kilometers south of the tsunami-ravaged coast. As of 2023, landslides and infrastructure damage are still highly evident throughout the Kii peninsula, including damage to the Kumano Kodo World Heritage sites. The death toll continued to rise rapidly and on the same day, Kyodo News updated the number of deaths to 32 and the number of missing to 57. Japan's newly elected Prime Minister Yoshihiko Noda said "We will do everything we can to rescue people and search for the missing". Both remnants of Talas and the outflow of Tropical Storm Noru together brought heavy rainfall of over 400 mm in Hokkaido.

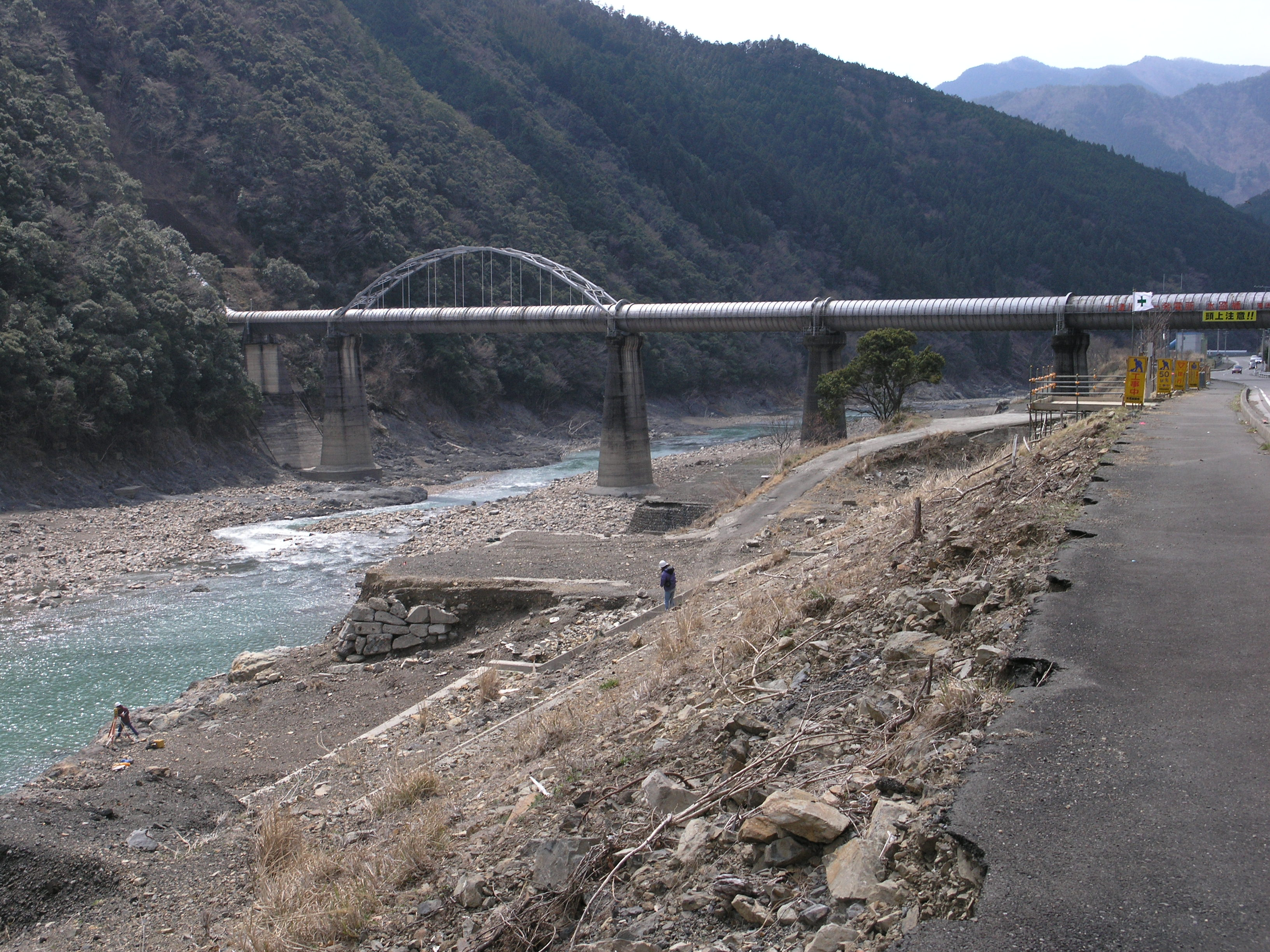
Aftermath of river flooding in Totsukawa, Nara

Electric and telephone lines in Mie, Nara and Wakayama prefectures were damaged, leaving some 194,000 households in the Kansai Electric Power Company's area with power outages. On September 6, aid-laden helicopters landed in the hardest-hit areas while police, firefighters and soldiers started clearing roads and debris so that they could distribute food, medicine and other assistance. However, thousands of people remained isolated for a long time because of the bad conditions of the roads, that prevented rescue workers from quickly reaching the victims. Relief materials such as canned food, rice balls, and drinking water were being supplied to the victims since the operation was started. Talas death toll continued to rise rapidly since the landfall. On September 7, the death toll was said to have increased to 40 with 50 people still missing. Later the same day, death toll continued to rise and reached 54 after reports from the search and rescue operations listed more people as dead. Soon, Air Worldwide reported that the total losses caused by Talas in Japan could have exceeded US$600 million. On September 8, the death toll rose to 59, while 50 others were still missing. Hundreds more remained stranded after several roads were damaged by the typhoon.

== See also ==
- Other tropical cyclones named Talas
- List of wettest tropical cyclones in Japan
- Typhoon Tokage (2004)
- Typhoon Roke (2011)
- Typhoon Halong (2014)
- Typhoon Nangka (2015)
- Typhoon Mindulle (2016)
