= List of storms named Chanchu =

The name Chanchu (Cantonese: 珍珠, [t͡sɐn˥ t͡syː˥]) has been used to name two tropical cyclones in the western North Pacific basin. The name was contributed by Macau and means "pearl" in Cantonese.

- Tropical Storm Chanchu (2000), (T0007, 12W) – formed from the remnants of Tropical Storm Upana.
- Typhoon Chanchu (2006), (T0601, 02W, Caloy) – a rare Category 4 typhoon during May in the South China Sea that initially traversed the Philippines and then made landfall in Guangdong, China.

The name Chanchu was retired following the 2006 Pacific typhoon season and was replaced by Sanba.
