= Tropical Storm Sonca (2017) =

Pacific tropical storm in 2017

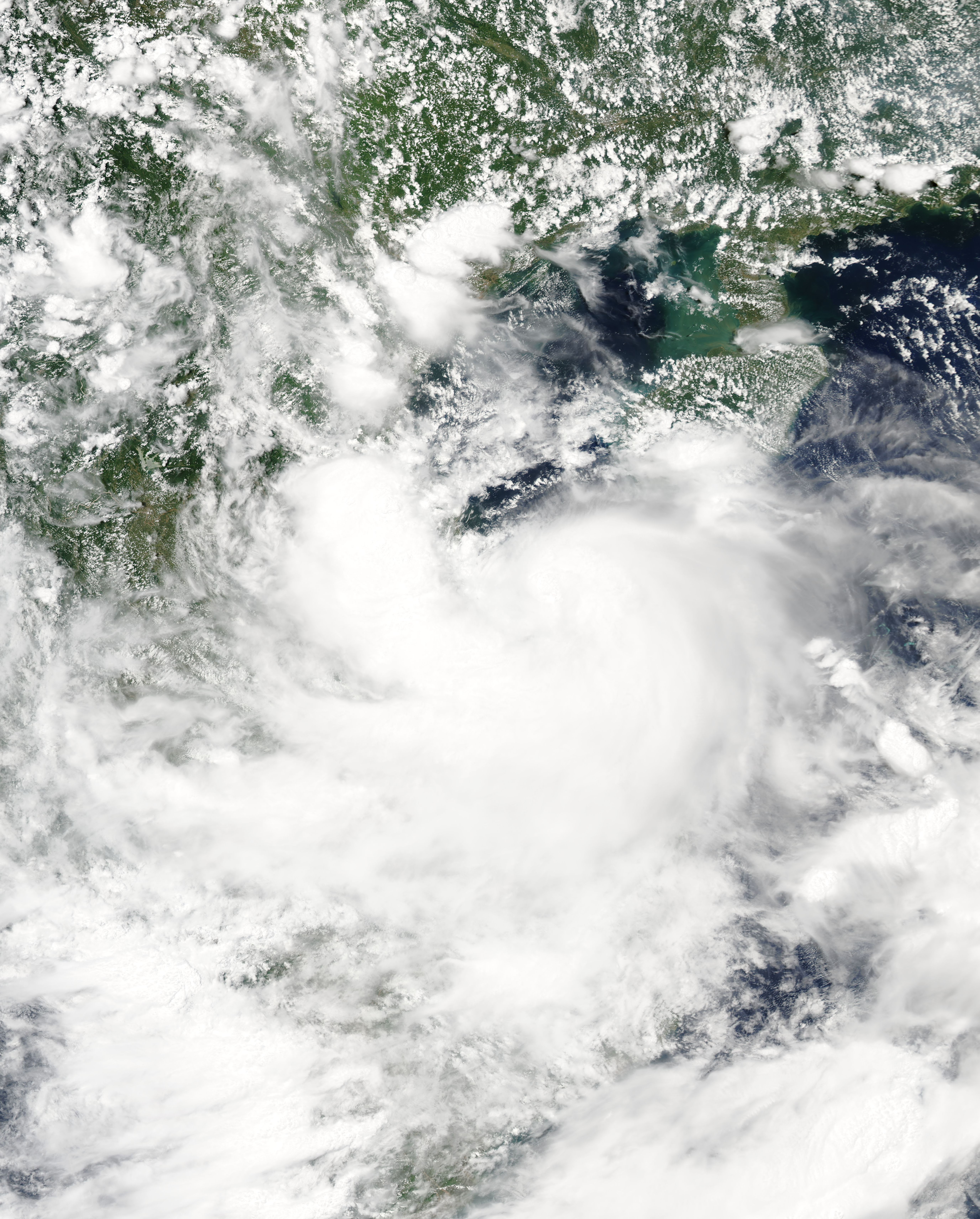
- Sonca nearing landfall on July 25

Meteorological history
- Formed: July 21, 2017
- Dissipated: July 29, 2017

Tropical storm
- 10-minute sustained (JMA)
- Highest winds: 65 km/h (40 mph)
- Lowest pressure: 994 hPa (mbar); 29.35 inHg

Tropical storm
- 1-minute sustained (SSHWS/JTWC)
- Highest winds: 85 km/h (50 mph)
- Lowest pressure: 989 hPa (mbar); 29.21 inHg

Overall effects
- Fatalities: 37 total
- Damage: $313 million (2017 USD)
- Areas affected: Hainan, Vietnam, Cambodia, Laos, Thailand (particularly Northeast Thailand), Myanmar
- IBTrACS
- Part of the 2017 Pacific typhoon season

Tropical Storm Sonca (Note: The name Sonca (Vietnamese: sơn ca, [səːn˧˧ kaː˧˧]) was contributed by Vietnam and refers to the Oriental skylark (Alauda gulgula) in Vietnamese.) was a weak tropical cyclone that impacted Indochina during the end of July 2017. As the 10th named storm of the 2017 Pacific typhoon season, Tropical Storm Sonca formed south of Hong Kong. After drifting westward for multiple days, the storm intensified into a tropical storm, receiving the name Sonca. The storm later affected Hainan, reaching its peak intensity. On July 25, the storm made landfall over the Quảng Trị province; the Joint Typhoon Warning Center (JTWC) issued their final advisory while the Japan Meteorological Agency (JMA) continued, downgrading the storm as a tropical depression. The storm officially dissipated on July 29.

The storm killed 37 people, with a damage of $313 million USD. (Note: 2017 USD.) In Vietnam, 1,500 houses were damaged, with an impact of $13 million USD. Fishermen pushed their boats ashore while heavy winds destroyed houses. The storm also affected Cambodia, killing three people and destroying 2,686 houses while the government and soldiers assisted evacuation efforts. Thailand was the most affected, with 23 fatalities and major flooding in numerous provinces.

== Meteorological history ==
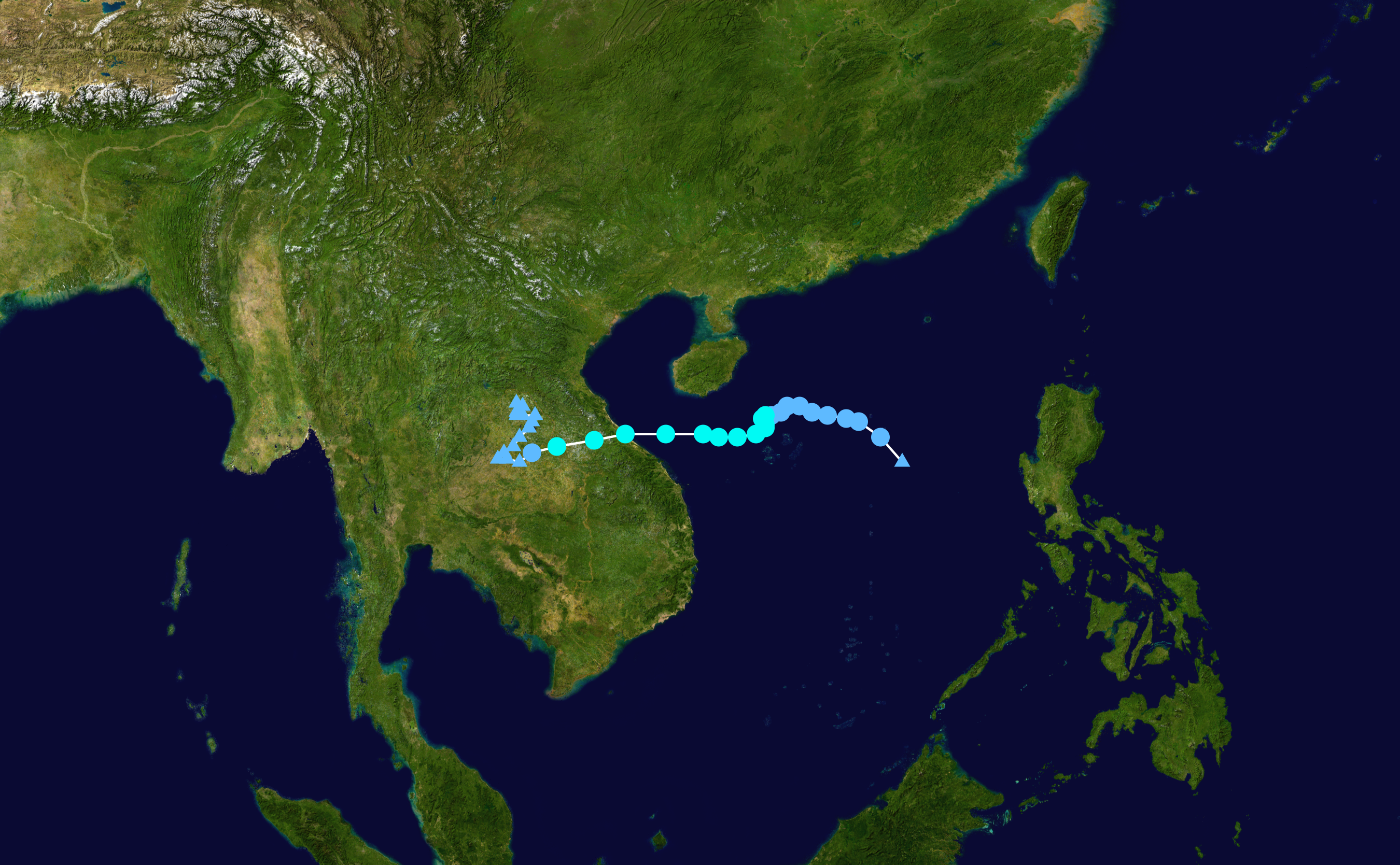
Map plotting the storm's track and intensity, according to the Saffir–Simpson scale Map key Saffir–Simpson scale Tropical depression (≤38 mph, ≤62 km/h) Tropical storm (39–73 mph, 63–118 km/h) Category 1 (74–95 mph, 119–153 km/h) Category 2 (96–110 mph, 154–177 km/h) Category 3 (111–129 mph, 178–208 km/h) Category 4 (130–156 mph, 209–251 km/h) Category 5 (≥157 mph, ≥252 km/h) Unknown Storm type Tropical cyclone Subtropical cyclone Extratropical cyclone, remnant low, tropical disturbance, or monsoon depression

On July 21, both the JMA and the JTWC reported that Tropical Depression 08W had developed approximately 582 km (361 mi) to the south of Hong Kong. The storm had a rapidly consolidating low-level circulation center. The storm had a marginally favorable environment, with slight improvement of poleward outflow. The JTWC later assessed that there was a likelihood for it to steadily intensify, but the peak intensity was uncertain, citing reasons such as poor initialization of the forecasting model and the small size of the tropical depression. The storm's environment remained favorable the following day, with vertical windshear offset by poleward outflow; the JTWC did not change their prediction. Early the next day, the JTWC designated the system as a tropical storm. The system intensified into a tropical storm by JMA on July 23, receiving the name Sonca.

After 13 hours, the storm was pulled southward by a building northern steering ridge. Just before the storm had its peak intensity, the storm rapidly intensified after reports of a consolidating low-level circulation center. The storm later accelerated north after a steering ridge reoriented the storm. By July 24, Sonca reached its maximum intensity with a minimum pressure of 994 hPa. Early on July 25, the JTWC issued its final advisory as the system made landfall over in the Quảng Trị Province, Vietnam. The storm was downgraded into a tropical depression that same day by the JMA. The storm traversed northwest, eventually weakening inside Thailand. The storm dissipated on July 29.

== Preparations and impact ==
=== Vietnam ===
Warning for Tropical Storm Sonca issued for Vietnam.

During the storm, heavy floods were recorded in Vietnam, causing extensive property damage, submerging 229 villages. A directive was sent to send firefighters and police to rescue people in the northern provinces of Vietnam. Vietnam Airlines cancelled 11 flights to and from the Phu Bai International Airport while VietJet Air cancelled 16. Fishermen from Quảng Trị moved their boats away from the shore due to strong waves and winds. The Nghệ An province banned all sea-related activities and ordered ships to return to the shore. Numerous houses and billboards were damaged from strong winds in the districts of Gio Linh and Vĩnh Linh. Five spillways in the largest lake in Nghệ An, were opened. Three national routes were flooded among four other provincial routes in Nghệ An. At least six people were killed as of July 31, all in the provinces of Hà Tĩnh and Quảng Trị. Approximately 1,500 houses were damaged in these two provinces. Across multiple Vietnamese provinces, roughly 5,777 hectares (14,280 acres) of paddy fields and 750 hectares (1,900 acres) of croplands were damaged. In Nghe An Province, the total damage caused by the storm exceeded 127 billion dong (US$5.6 million) as of July 28. Total damage in Vietnam reached 300.7 billion dong (US$13 million).

=== Cambodia ===
The Ministry of Water Resources and Meteorology warned everyone, especially fishermen and people at sea to avoid accidents during the storm. Authorities issued a flood warning and "safety hills" were set up with shelter, food, and supplies. The Royal Cambodian Armed Forces deployed 350 soldiers to Preah Vihear to aid in relief efforts; a provincial official of the Kampong Thom province stated that the government was preparing to evacuate residents. The Steung Saen River reached a height of 13.4 metres (44 feet), close to emergency levels. Water levels at the Tamok Bridge rose 1 m (3.3 ft) above the average level. The governor of the Choam Khsant District stated that four communes in the district were flooded. Tropical Storm Sonca, due to its heavy floods, affected four provinces across Cambodia, three people died, and 2,686 houses were submerged. 53 households, 550 affected families, and 1000 displaced residents were affected. Two of the deaths were caused by drowning. In the Choam Khsant District, 48 families had to be evacuated because of the storm.

=== Thailand ===
The hardest hit province was Sakon Nakhon, Northeast Thailand. Damages in Sakon Nakhon exceeded 100 million baht (US$3 million). The floods created by the storm were the strongest floods in the province in two decades. Heavy rain damaged bridges in Khon Kaen province and flooded buildings in Ubon Ratchathani province and Sisaket province, where some people were relocated to temporary accommodations. In Lopburi province, some people were assisted into boats after the roads became impassable. In Sukhothai province, the Yom River flooded, and sandbags were used to help contain the floodwaters. Trains had to be re-routed in Nong Khai province when telephone poles fell on the tracks. Villages in Chiang Rai were inundated due to the overflowing of a river on July 24. The next day, a flash flood occurred at the Den Chai district due to continuous rainfall. On July 26, rainfall caused the water level in the Phayao Lake to reach full capacity. Small cars struggled to pass roads in Kalasin due to flooding. Roads were destroyed in Khon Kaen while a landslide blocked a train tunnel in Chaiyaphum. A broken flood wall caused flooding in Sukhothai province. Flash flood occurred in eight provinces in Ranong while flooding also occurred in eight districts of Nakhon Ratchasima; the flooding in three were severe. In total, the damage from flooding triggered by the storm in Thailand reached 10 billion baht (US$300 million).

== See also ==
- Other storms named Sonca
- Weather of 2017
- Tropical cyclones in 2017
- Tropical Storm Aere (2016)
- Tropical Storm Vamco (2015)
- October 2017 Vietnam tropical depression
- Tropical Storm Haikui (2017)
- Tropical Storm Son-Tinh (2018)
- Tropical Storm Soulik (2024)
