= List of storms named Talas =

The name Talas (Tagalog: talas, [ˈtaː.lɐs]) has been used for four tropical cyclones in the western North Pacific Ocean. The name was contributed by the Philippines and means "sharpness" or "acuteness" in Tagalog.

- Tropical Storm Talas (2004) (T0428, 31W, Zosimo) – brushed Ebeye Island and affected Ujae Atoll in the Marshall Islands.
- Severe Tropical Storm Talas (2011) (T1112, 15W) – an unusually large storm that caused widespread damage in Japan, killing 82.
- Severe Tropical Storm Talas (2017) (T1704, 06W) – made landfall in Central Vietnam and dissipated in Laos, causing 14 fatalities.
- Tropical Storm Talas (2022) (T2215, 17W) – brushed the coast of Japan, claiming 3 lives.

| Preceded by Nanmadol | Pacific typhoon season names Talas | Succeeded by Hodu |
