= Tropical Storm Talas (2022) =

2022 Pacific tropical storm

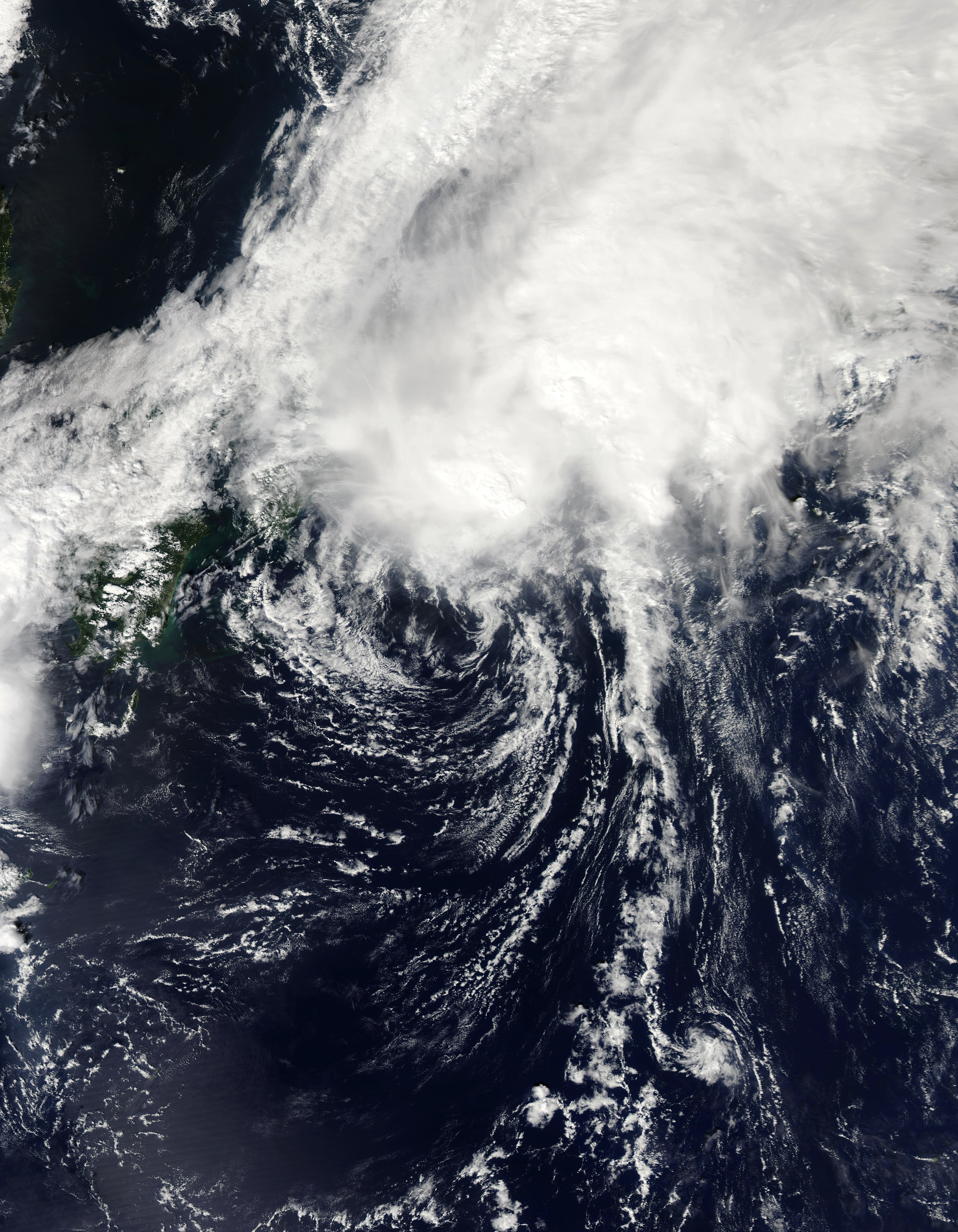
- Tropical Storm Talas at peak intensity, approaching Japan on September 23

Meteorological history
- Formed: September 20, 2022
- Extratropical: September 24, 2022
- Dissipated: September 27, 2022

Tropical storm
- 10-minute sustained (JMA)
- Highest winds: 65 km/h (40 mph)
- Lowest pressure: 1000 hPa (mbar); 29.53 inHg

Tropical storm
- 1-minute sustained (SSHWS/JTWC)
- Highest winds: 65 km/h (40 mph)
- Lowest pressure: 985 hPa (mbar); 29.09 inHg

Overall effects
- Fatalities: 3 total
- Damage: $1.38 billion (2022 USD)
- Areas affected: Japan
- IBTrACS
- Part of the 2022 Pacific typhoon season

Tropical Storm Talas (Note: The name Talas (Tagalog: talas, [ˈtaː.lɐs]) was contributed by the Philippines and means "sharpness, acuteness" in Tagalog.) was a weak but destructive tropical cyclone which brought record-breaking rainfall to Japan in late-September 2022. The fifteenth named storm of the annual Pacific typhoon season, Talas formed as a tropical depression several hundred miles northwest of the Mariana Islands on September 20. The depression turned northwest and intensified to Tropical Storm Talas on September 23. Talas curved northeastward and began to weaken while approaching the eastern Japan. It weakened to a tropical depression later that day. Talas became extratropical on the next day just south of the Tōkai region. The extratropical remnants continued to move slowly to the northeast, and dissipated on September 27 to the east of Honshu.

In advance of the storm, thousands of people were evacuated in vulnerable areas. Although Talas remained weak and never made landfall, the rainbands to its north brought heavy precipitation to eastern Japan, which triggered flooding and landslides. 120,000 families experienced power outages in the region. Shizuoka Prefecture was the hardest-hit prefecture across the country. Many places in the prefecture broke the record of highest amount of precipitation. Talas killed three people and injured six others. Across the country, almost 13,000 houses were damaged by the storm, and the total damage reached ¥198 billion (US$1.38 billion).

== Meteorological history ==
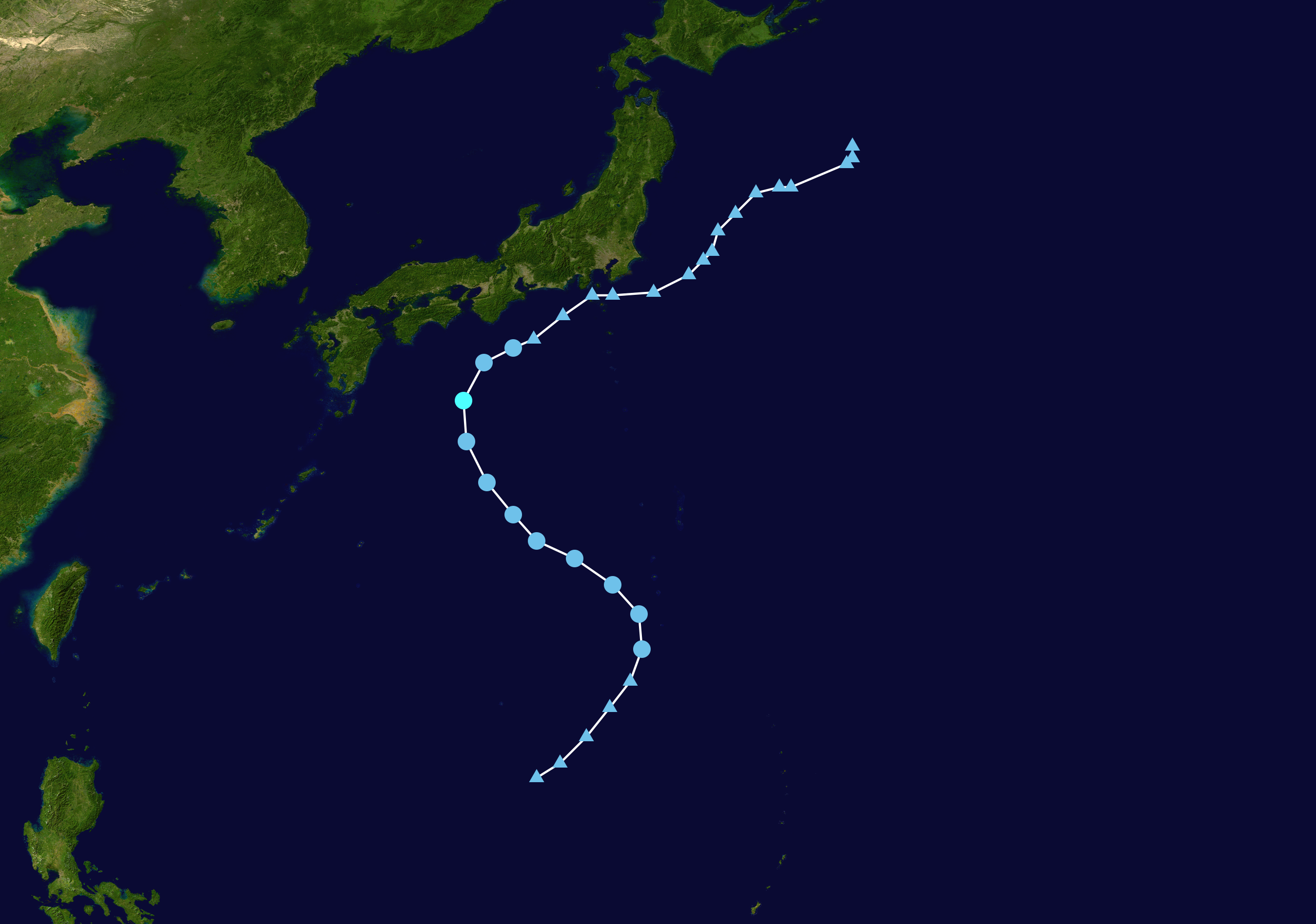
Map plotting the storm's track and intensity, according to the Saffir–Simpson scale Map key Saffir–Simpson scale Tropical depression (≤38 mph, ≤62 km/h) Tropical storm (39–73 mph, 63–118 km/h) Category 1 (74–95 mph, 119–153 km/h) Category 2 (96–110 mph, 154–177 km/h) Category 3 (111–129 mph, 178–208 km/h) Category 4 (130–156 mph, 209–251 km/h) Category 5 (≥157 mph, ≥252 km/h) Unknown Storm type Tropical cyclone Subtropical cyclone Extratropical cyclone, remnant low, tropical disturbance, or monsoon depression

Late on September 20, the Japan Meteorological Agency (JMA) first noted that a tropical depression formed at 21°N 141°E, about 930 km (580 mi) northwest of Guam. On the next day, the Joint Typhoon Warning Center (JTWC) also noted the possibility of tropical cyclogenesis, as the system tracked northward while located in a warm sea surface temperatures of 29–30 °C (84–86 °F) and low wind shear. A trough to the west also increased poleward outflow. At 21:00 UTC, the JTWC upgraded the system to a tropical depression and designated it as 17W. The system turned northwestward as steered by a mid-level subtropical ridge. Despite the center was partly exposed, deep convection increased near the center, both JMA and JTWC upgraded the system to a tropical storm early on September 23, and the former agency assigned the name Talas. The storm turned northeast under the influence of westerlies. As Talas gained latitudes, ocean heat content dropped and wind shear increased, convection was sheared to the northeast and the center became fully exposed. The JTWC downgraded Talas to a tropical depression a few hours later. Talas transitioned to an extratropical cyclone early on September 24, and the system passed about 140 km (87 mi) south of Tokyo later that day. The extratropical remnants continued to drift northeastward, and dissipated on September 27, east of Honshu.

== Preparations, impact and aftermath ==
Despite Talas remaining offshore, the rainbands to its north brought heavy rains to eastern Japan. The Japan Meteorological Agency (JMA) issued a heavy rain warning for Shizuoka Prefecture and the Kantō region on September 23. The agency also issued a landslide warning for Aichi and Shizuoka Prefecture, as a front was expected to approach northern Japan on September 24, and the interaction between the front and Talas was expected to bring additional rainfall to the region. The Fire and Disaster Management Agency issued evacuation orders to various cities and villages in Ibaraki, Tochigi, Chiba, Kanogawa, Shizuoka, Aichi, and Mie Prefecture, including 3,000 people in Yokohama. The JR Central bullet train services on Tokaido Shinkansen were suspended, while services between Tokyo and Mishima Station retained, but was limited to 1–2 trains per hour. 1,000 people were stranded in Shizuoka.

Talas brought torrential rains to eastern Japan. The region recorded heavy precipitation, particularly in the Shizuoka Prefecture. In Shizuoka, the 24-hour precipitation reached 417 mm (16.4 in), the highest in the country's history. Fujieda, Moru, and Hamamatsu recorded 403 mm (15.9 in), 360.5 mm (14.19 in) and 280.5 mm (11.04 in) respectively, which also broke the record of highest 24-hour precipitation in history. Many places in Shizuoka Prefecture recorded a 24-hour precipitation of at least 200 mm (7.9 in). A JEF1 tornado struck the region between Omaezaki and Makinohara on September 23. Shizuoka was the hardest-hit city across the prefecture, and the scale of the flooding and landslides was the most severe since 1977. River dams were damaged by heavy rainfall, and the river channels in the Abe River were blocked due to soil runoff. The Okitsu River was flooded by a large amount of sediment and driftwood, which made it difficult for water extraction. Moreover, a waterpipe bridge collapsed, and left 63,000 families in Shimizu-ku without water supply until October 6. Talas killed three people and six others were injured, all in Shizuoka prefecture. A man died in Kakegawa after a landslide struck the city. Another man died after his car was plunged into a reservoir. At least 120,000 families experienced power outages as two electricity pylons were knocked by landslides. 12,995 houses were affected by the storm, in which six of them were destroyed. Agricultural damage amounted to be ¥15.4 billion (US$107 million). The Japanese government estimated the total damage to be ¥198 billion (US$1.38 billion).

On September 26, the governor of Shizuoka Prefecture, Heita Kawakatsu, requested the Self-Defense Forces to be dispatched to clean up the damage caused by Talas.

== See also ==
- Weather of 2022
- Tropical cyclones in 2022
- Typhoon Maria (2006)
- Typhoon Roke (2011)
- Typhoon Lan (2017)
- Typhoon Hagibis
- Tropical Storm Meari (2022)
