= List of storms named Sonca =

The name Sonca (Vietnamese: sơn ca, [səːn˧˧ kaː˧˧]) has been used for four tropical cyclones in the West Pacific Ocean. The name, contributed by Vietnam, refers to the Oriental skylark (Alauda gulgula) in Vietnamese.

- Typhoon Sonca (2005) (T0503, 03W, Bising) – remained out to sea.
- Typhoon Sonca (2011) (T1116, 19W) – skirted the eastern coast of Japan.
- Tropical Storm Sonca (2017) (T1708, 08W) – a weak storm that struck Vietnam.
- Tropical Storm Sonca (2022) (T2219, 22W) – a weak storm that struck Vietnam.

Preceded by Roke	Pacific typhoon season names Sonca	Succeeded by Nesat
