= List of storms named Kulap =

The name Kulap (Thai: กุหลาบ, [kū.làːp]) has been used for four tropical cyclones in the western North Pacific Ocean. This name was originally spelled Kularb by the WMO before an orthographic update in 2002. The name was contributed by Thailand and means "rose" in Thai.

- Severe Tropical Storm Kulap (2005) (T0501, 01W) – remained over the open ocean.
- Tropical Storm Kulap (2011) (T1114, 17W, Nonoy) – passed through the Ryukyu Islands.
- Tropical Storm Kulap (2017) (T1706, 09W) – absorbed by Typhoon Noru.
- Severe Tropical Storm Kulap (2022) (T2217, 19W) – remained over the open ocean.

Preceded by Hodu	Pacific typhoon season names Kulap	Succeeded by Roke
