= Typhoon Roke (2011) =

Pacific typhoon in 2011

Typhoon Roke (Onyok)
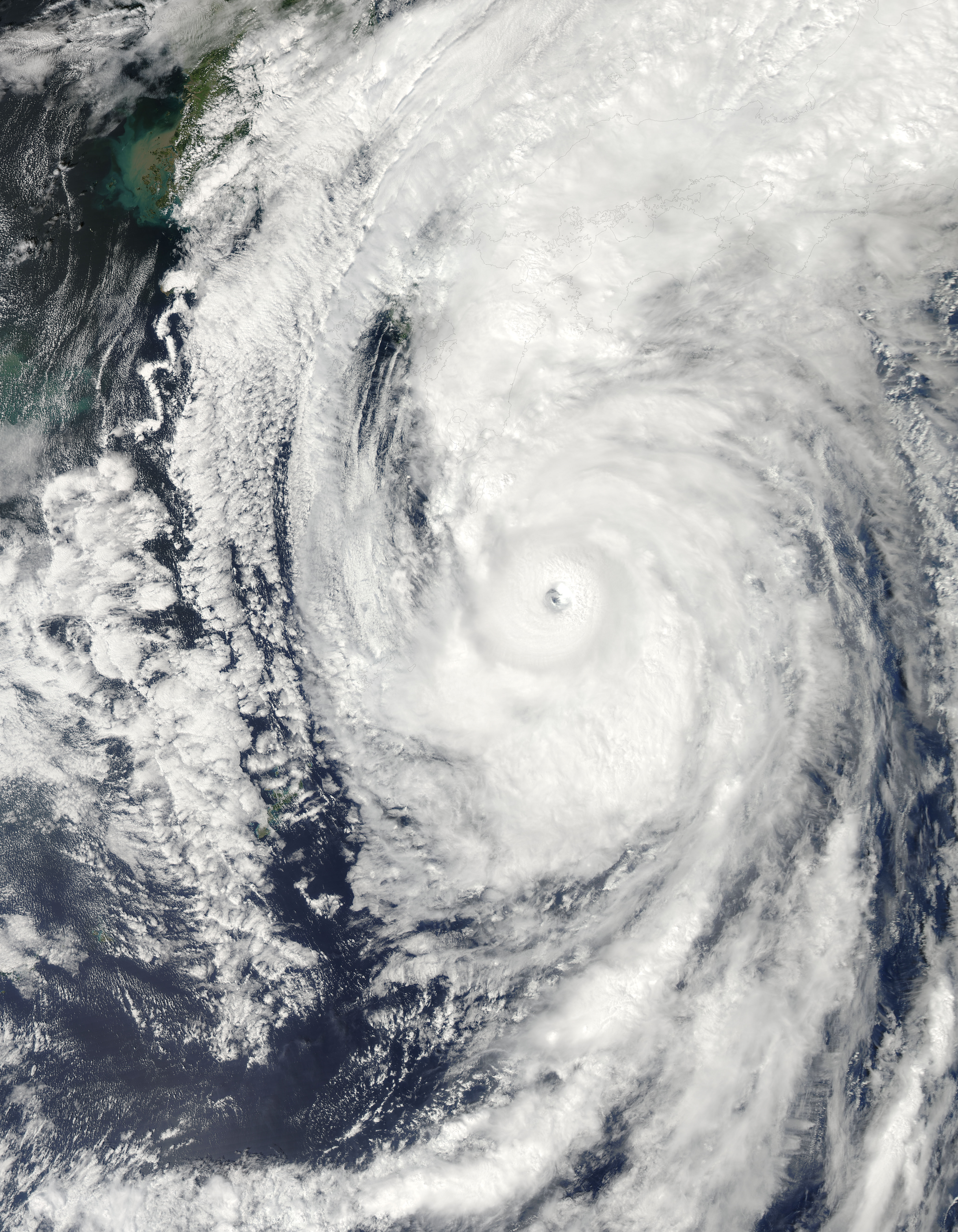
- Typhoon Roke approaching Japan near peak intensity on September 20

Meteorological history
- Formed: September 9, 2011
- Extratropical: September 22, 2011
- Dissipated: September 24, 2011

Very strong typhoon
- 10-minute sustained (JMA)
- Highest winds: 155 km/h (100 mph)
- Lowest pressure: 940 hPa (mbar); 27.76 inHg

Category 4-equivalent typhoon
- 1-minute sustained (SSHWS/JTWC)
- Highest winds: 215 km/h (130 mph)
- Lowest pressure: 937 hPa (mbar); 27.67 inHg

Overall effects
- Fatalities: 13 total
- Damage: $1.7 billion (2011 USD)
- Areas affected: Japan, Russia
- IBTrACS
- Part of the 2011 Pacific typhoon season

Typhoon Roke, (Note: The name Roke (Chamorro: Roke, [ɾoki]) was contributed by the United States and is a masculine given name referring to "Saint Roch" in Chamorro.) known in the Philippines as Tropical Storm Onyok, was a powerful and persistent tropical cyclone that affected Japan, including some areas that had been damaged by Talas just a few weeks prior. It was the fifteenth named storm, the tenth severe tropical storm, the sixth typhoon of the 2011 Pacific typhoon season and overall, the 27th tropical cyclone to be monitored by the Japan Meteorological Agency during the year.

== Meteorological history ==
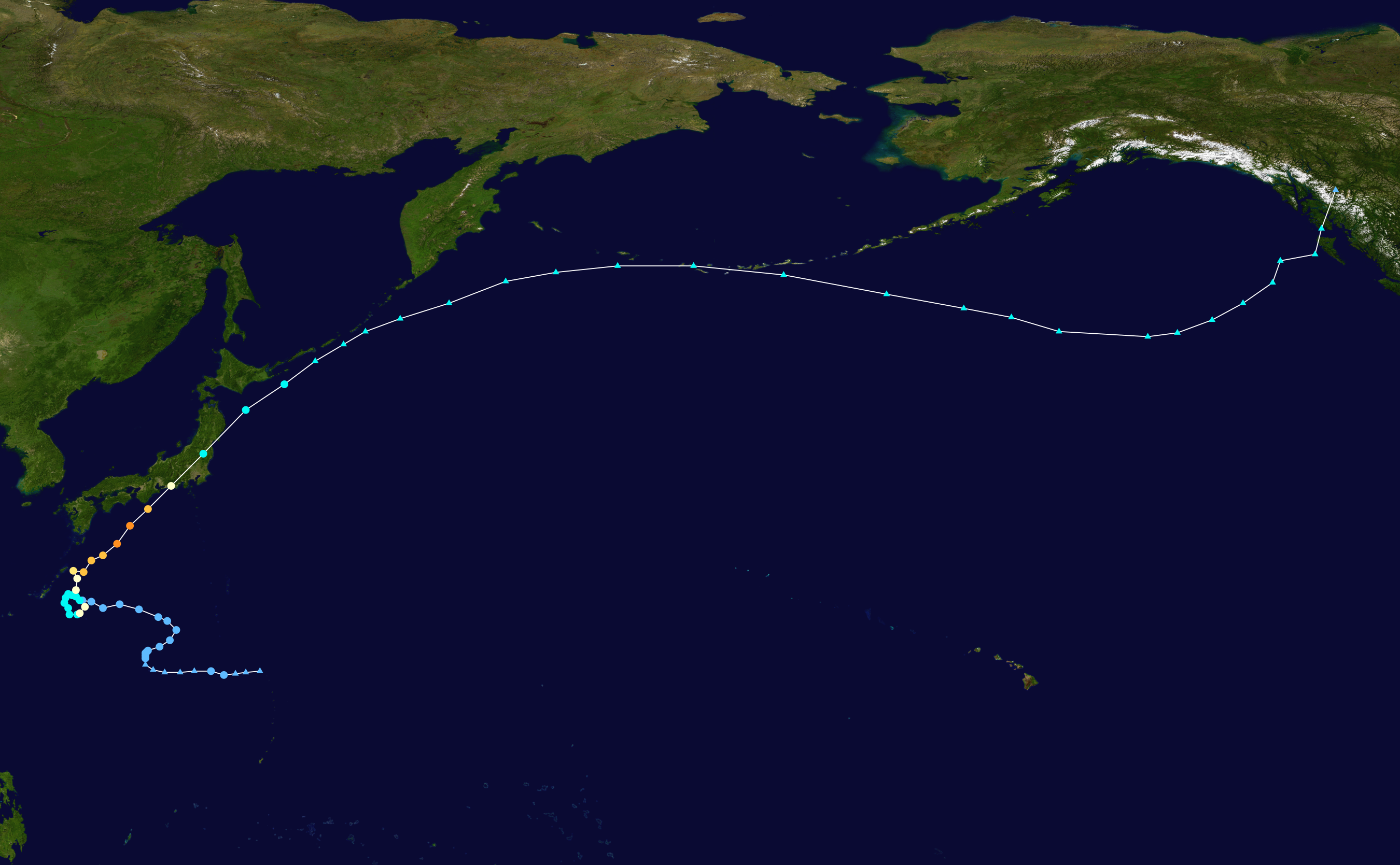
Map plotting the storm's track and intensity, according to the Saffir–Simpson scale Map key Saffir–Simpson scale Tropical depression (≤38 mph, ≤62 km/h) Tropical storm (39–73 mph, 63–118 km/h) Category 1 (74–95 mph, 119–153 km/h) Category 2 (96–110 mph, 154–177 km/h) Category 3 (111–129 mph, 178–208 km/h) Category 4 (130–156 mph, 209–251 km/h) Category 5 (≥157 mph, ≥252 km/h) Unknown Storm type Tropical cyclone Subtropical cyclone Extratropical cyclone, remnant low, tropical disturbance, or monsoon depression

On September 8, the Joint Typhoon Warning Center started to monitor a tropical disturbance that had developed about 935 km (580 mi) to the northeast of Hagåtña, Guam. Unorganized deep convection was surrounding the disturbances developing low level circulation centre, in an area of low vertical windshear and improving outflow. During that day the disturbance gradually developed further while moving westwards under the influence of a subtropical ridge of high pressure. During September 9, as the system continued to move westwards, the Japan Meteorological Agency reported that the disturbance had developed into a tropical depression. Continuing to move westwards the system gradually developed further with the depressions low level circulation centre consolidating before it was declared Tropical Depression 18W by the Joint Typhoon Warning Center during the next day.

Over the next two days, the system gradually drifted west and intensified slightly, prompting the Joint Typhoon Warning Center (JTWC) to issue a Tropical Cyclone Formation Alert (TCFA) on it. Convection gradually consolidated the low-level circulation center (LLCC) and the JTWC initiated advisories on the system on September 11, designating it with 18W. The next day, the depression drifted into the Philippine Area of Responsibility (PAR) and the Philippine Atmospheric, Geophysical and Astronomical Services Administration (PAGASA) initiated advisories on the depression, naming it Onyok. However, just as similar to Kulap, Onyok also exited the PAR in 6 hours from entering the region. In an advisory, the JTWC reported that there were at least two more vortices associated with the system, that caused an abrupt, erratic movement. However, being located in an area of warm sea surface temperatures and low vertical wind shear, the depression continued to strengthen and on September 13, the JMA upgraded the depression to a tropical storm and named it Roke.

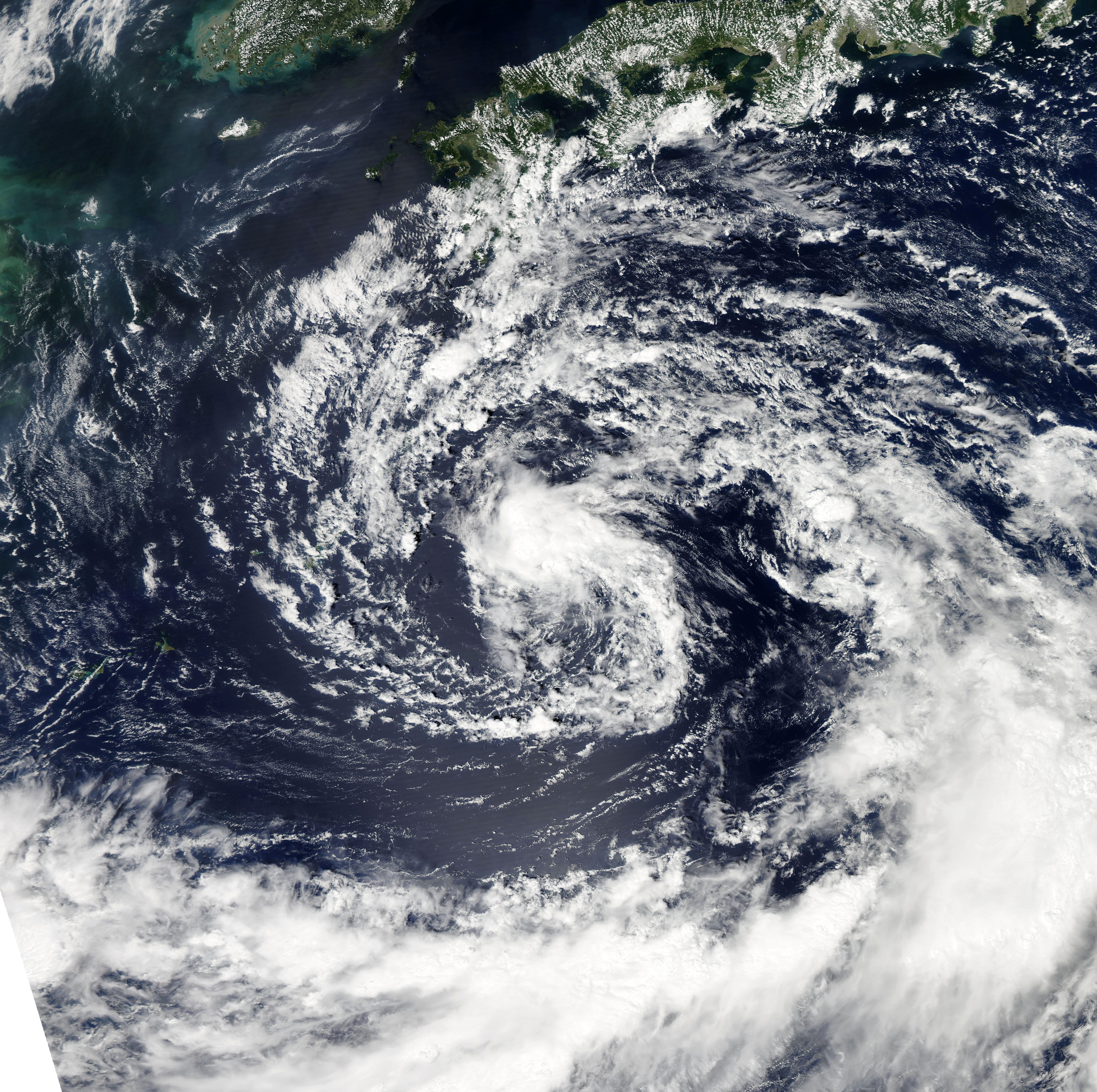
Tropical Storm Roke with an exposed low-level circulation on September 15

On September 14, a Tropical upper tropospheric trough (TUTT) cell located approximately 05 degrees to the west of the system caused strong subsidence prompting the JTWC to downgrade Roke to a tropical depression. However, because of favorable atmospheric conditions, Roke strengthened again, and the JTWC re-upgraded Roke to a tropical storm. On September 16, the previously exposed LLCC was being re-consolidated with convection and Roke continued to strengthen again. Despite the upper low over the LLCC, Roke remained a warm-core tropical cyclone and the JTWC predicted that there were chances of Roke become a hybrid or a subtropical storm. On continuing its west-northwestward movement, Roke eventually slowed to under 2 knots (3.7 km/h; 2.3 mph) with a tongue of cloud-free air entering the LLCC from the west side. Due to a mid-level warm anomaly, the subtropical transition was taking place at an unusually slow rate. Later, that day, Roke turned to the southwest and slowed with convection consolidating and deepening near the LLCC. What began as a monsoonal depression with an elongated and weak LLCC was now more stronger and organized. Also, the TUTT cell above the system started weakening and data from an ASCAT scatterometer pass revealed that the storm started to strengthen and the JTWC no longer expected a subtropical transition.

On September 17, the JTWC reported that Roke developed a small, deep convective eye with an unusually large convective band surrounding the southern periphery of the storm. At that time, Roke was approximately 170 nautical miles (310 km; 200 mi) east of Kadena Air Base, Japan with winds of over 60 knots (110 km/h; 69 mph). As a result, the JMA upgraded Roke to a severe tropical storm. However, Roke soon started become elongated around the northeast quadrant as a response to the strong westerlies ahead of a mid-latitude trough. But this was not for too long. Roke quickly became organized again and developed an excellent equatoward outflow and continued to strengthen. Then, being located in an area of low vertical wind shear and abnormally high sea surface temperatures, Roke underwent rapid deepening and became a Category 1 typhoon on the SSHS with a maximum sustained windspeed of 70 knots (130 km/h; 81 mph) (1-min sustained). The JTWC later reported that Roke underwent Explosive intensification, a more extreme case of rapid deepening that involves a tropical cyclone deepening at a rate of at least 2.5 mbar per hour for a minimum of 12 hours. Also, they added that Roke developed a 10 nautical miles (19 km; 12 mi) eye and a good poleward outflow channel. On September 21, Typhoon Roke made landfall over Hamamatsu, Japan at about 5:00 UTC (14:00 JST).

Soon Roke started weakening as cloud tops started getting warmed up and eye diameter started to decrease. However, the system still maintained a near radial outflow and the convective structure continued to remain organized that kept Roke from dissipating rapidly. Although Roke entered a de-intensification phase, it still had plenty of strength that posed a great threat to regions of Japan. Being located approximately 330 nautical miles (610 km; 380 mi) southwest of Yokosuka, Kanagawa, the typhoon accelerated northeastward at approximately 16 knots (30 km/h; 18 mph) with winds of over 100 knots (190 km/h; 120 mph) (1-min sustained) being a Category 3 typhoon on the SSHS. Being embedded in the baroclinic zone, Roke started its extratropical transition. Also, land interaction severely weakened the storm to a minimal Category 1 typhoon with winds of under 70 knots (130 km/h; 81 mph) (1-min sustained). Only six hours later, the storm further weakened and accelerated northeastward at approximately 31 knots (57 km/h; 36 mph) with rapidly dissipating deep convection completely sheared to the northeast of the LLCC. As a result, the JTWC ceased advisories on the storm, as it became fully extratropical.

== Preparations ==
=== Taiwan ===
On September 16, the Central Weather Bureau, the government meteorological research and forecasting institution of the Republic of China (Taiwan) reported that the outer bands of the storm might bring heavy rains to the northern part of the country over the next few days after slowly brushing the Japanese islands of Okinawa.

=== Japan ===
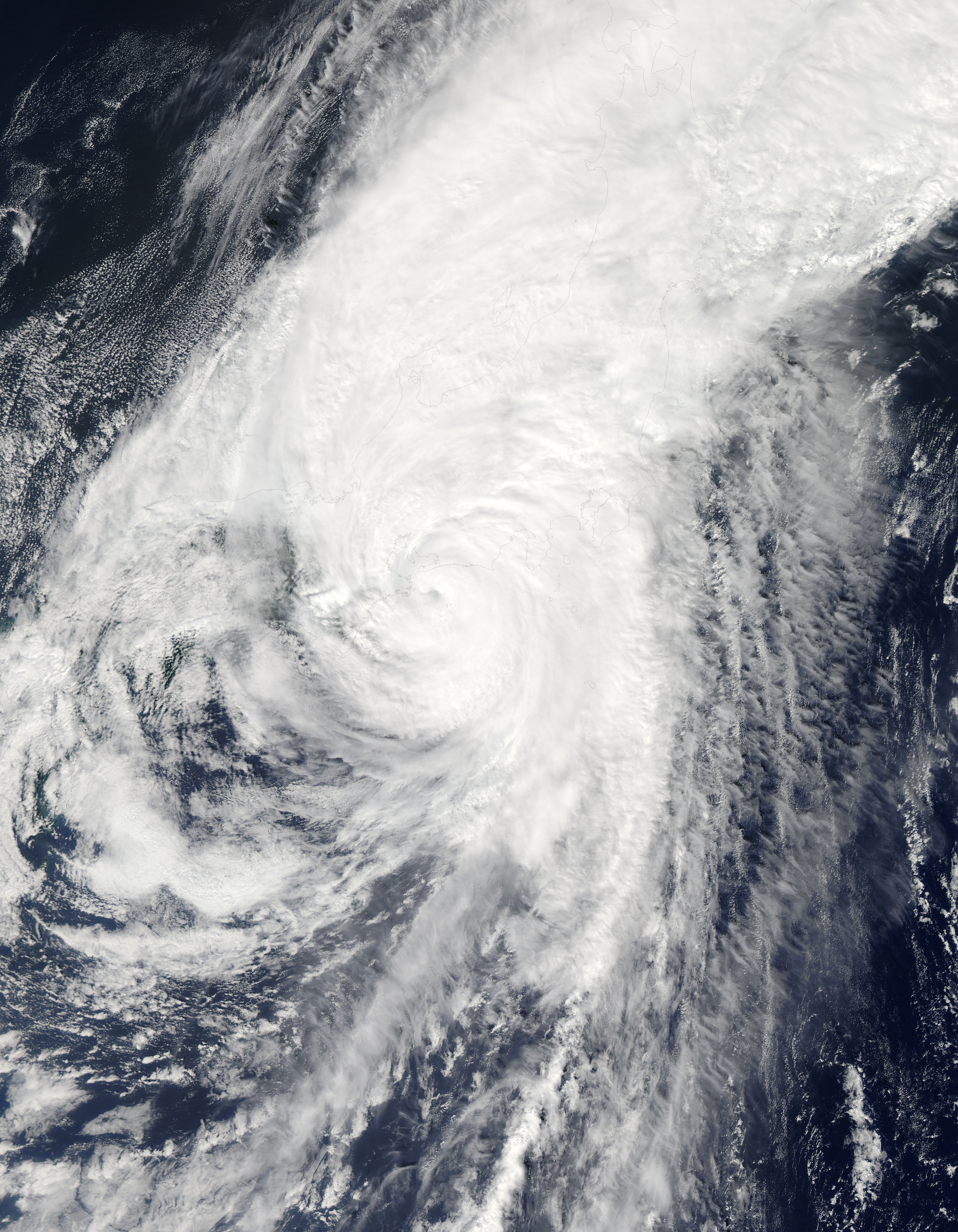
Typhoon Roke affecting Japan on September 21

On September 16, the Japanese refiner company Nansei Sekiyu KK announced that they suspended marine operations for the rest of the week at its Nishihara refinery in Okinawa Prefecture that produces some 100,000 barrels per day (16,000 m^{3}/d) as the storm neared land. Also, a football match was preponed by a day because of the storm's proximity to the island. The game was played during strong winds caused by Roke. On September 18, The national weather agency of Japan warned the residents of wide areas across the Japanese archipelago of heavy rainfall, landslides and flash flooding that the strengthening storm can trigger in Japan, after in changed course from heading towards the Okinawa Islands to mainland Japan. Also, concerns grew as the storm was heading towards the same area which was devastated by Talas, an unusually large but weak tropical cyclone that hit the region just a few weeks ago. Parts of the Kii Peninsula which were still in ruins were in a great danger as water levels of the mud dam rose to 70 centimeters, just below its maximum capacity. It was feared that as the storm brushes the southern coast, it could worsen the conditions caused by Typhoon Talas. Hundreds of thousands of people in Japan were asked to evacuate their homes and move to safer places as Typhoon Roke neared southwestern Japan, on its way to hit the main island of Honshu with winds of over 100 knots (190 km/h; 120 mph). It was reported that a further 23,000 people in western Japan were advised to seek shelter from flood and landslide prone areas. Over a million people, more than double the numbers for typhoon Talas, living in Nagoya were also forced to evacuate. The typhoon was expected to batter the island nation for three continuous days, as it moved through the tsunami ravaged Fukushima Prefecture. City officials in Nagoya upgraded the evacuation advisory to the strongest level available and doubled the number of people who are subjected to the notice as local rivers brimmed with heavy rain.

== Impact ==
=== Japan ===
Impact
Casualties		Damage (USD)
Deaths	Missing	Damage (USD)
13	3	$1.7 billion

We have taken every possible measure against the typhoon. We have tied down cables and hoses while fixing equipment so that radioactive materials will not spread in violent winds

— Tokyo Electric Power Company

On approaching Japan, the typhoon instantly claimed four lives in central and western Japan, leaving two more missing in Gifu Prefecture following widespread flooding triggered by the heavy rains. A large number of expressways were closed and up-to 200 flights were cancelled after floodwater reached knee-level. Toyota Motor Corp, a multinational automaker headquartered in Toyota City, Aichi, Japan, shut down 11 factories in central Japan eliminating evening shifts due to the typhoon. The Chief Cabinet Secretary Osamu Fujimura said, "We need to exercise the maximum caution against heavy rain, strong winds and high waves in wide areas from western to northern Japan, according to the Meteorological agency". Soon, the strong winds and heavy rains cut power to more than 575,500 households in Tokyo Electric Power Company's service area. Also, commuter trains were halted and thousands of passengers were stranded though they tried to go home early before the storm hit Tokyo. Later on September 21, local police and media reported that thirteen people were dead after being swept away by overflowing rivers. Unlike Talas, Roke moved significantly fast both inland and over the ocean. However, it was also unusually stronger. Also, the Nissan Motor Company's spokesman Chris Keeffe said "workers at its Yokohama headquarters and nearby technical facilities were being told to go home early for safety reasons, and two plants were not operating." Typhoon Roke caused no immediate problems other than broken security cameras at the Fukushima Dai-ichi nuclear power plant, which had been in its path overnight. The plant had been sent into meltdown by the March 11 earthquake and tsunami, and efforts are still under way to bring the reactors under control.

=== Other areas ===
The extratropical remnants of Typhoon Roke hit parts of Russia, Alaska and Canada. Heavy rain fell in the Alaska Panhandle and British Columbia.

== See also ==
- Other tropical cyclones named Roke
- Tropical Storm Talas (2011)
- Typhoon Wipha (2013)
- Typhoon Lionrock (2016)
- Typhoon Noru (2017)
