= List of storms named Haitang =

The name Haitang (Mandarin: 海棠, [xaɪ˧˩˧ tʰɑŋ˧˥]) has been used for four tropical cyclones in the Western Pacific Ocean. The name was contributed by China and refers to the crabapple tree (Malus spectabilis) in Mandarin.

- Typhoon Haitang (2005) (T0505, 05W, Feria) – struck Taiwan and China; strongest storm in the annual season.
- Tropical Storm Haitang (2011) (T1118, 21W) – made landfall in Vietnam.
- Tropical Storm Haitang (2017) (T1710, 12W, Huaning) – struck Taiwan and China.
- Tropical Storm Haitang (2022) (T2221, 24W) – churned in the open ocean and affected no land areas.

Preceded by Nesat	Pacific typhoon season names Haitang	Succeeded by Jamjari
