= List of storms named Jelawat =

The name Jelawat (Malay: jelawat, [dʒəlawat]) has been used for five tropical cyclones in the western North Pacific Ocean. The name was contributed by Malaysia and means a sultan fish (Leptobarbus hoevenii).

- Typhoon Jelawat (2000) (T0008, 13W) – made landfall in China as a weakening typhoon.
- Tropical Storm Jelawat (2006) (T0602, 03W, Domeng) – impacted China.
- Typhoon Jelawat (2012) (T1217, 18W, Lawin) – a Category 5 super typhoon that struck Japan.
- Typhoon Jelawat (2018) (T1803, 03W, Caloy) – an early-season Category 4 super typhoon.
- Tropical Storm Jelawat (2023) (T2317, 18W, Kabayan) – a late-season storm that traversed Mindanao.

Preceded by Sanba	Pacific typhoon season names Jelawat	Succeeded by Tirou
