= List of storms named Roke =

The name Roke has been used for three tropical cyclones in the West Pacific Ocean. The name was contributed by the United States and is a masculine given name referring to Saint Roch in Chamorro.

- Tropical Storm Roke (2005) (T0502, 02W, Auring) – a severe tropical storm that struck the Philippines
- Typhoon Roke (2011) (T1115, 18W, Onyok) – a Category 4 storm that struck Japan in September 2011
- Tropical Storm Roke (2017) (T1707, 10W, Fabian) – made landfall in Hong Kong as a tropical depression
- Typhoon Roke (2022) (T2218, 20W, Luis) – a typhoon that did not threaten any land areas

== See also ==
- Hurricane Loke (2015) – a Central Pacific Ocean tropical cyclone with a similar name

Preceded by Kulap	Pacific typhoon season names Roke	Succeeded by Sonca
