= List of storms named Nakri =

The name Nakri (Khmer: ណាគ្រី, [naː.ˈkriː]) has been used for five tropical cyclones in the western North Pacific Ocean. The name was contributed by Cambodia and refers to the night-blooming jasmine (Cestrum nocturnum) in Khmer.

- Severe Tropical Storm Nakri (2002) (T0208, 11W, Hambalos) – brushed Taiwan and Okinawa.
- Typhoon Nakri (2008) (T0805, 06W, Enteng) – remained out at sea.
- Severe Tropical Storm Nakri (2014) (T1412, 12W, Inday) – very large storm which affected the Ryukyu Islands and the Korean Peninsula.
- Typhoon Nakri (2019) (T1924, 25W, Quiel) – developed west of the Philippines and made landfall in Southern Vietnam.
- Typhoon Nakri (2025) (T2523, 29W, Quedan) – Category 1 typhoon which passed near the coast of Japan.

Preceded by Halong	Pacific typhoon season names Nakri	Succeeded by Fengshen
