= List of storms named Sanba =

The name Sanba (Mandarin: 三巴, [sän˥ pä˥]) has been used for three tropical cyclones in the western North Pacific Ocean. It replaced the name Chanchu after it was retired following the 2006 Pacific typhoon season. The name was contributed by Macau and refers to the Ruins of Saint Paul's in Mandarin.

- Typhoon Sanba (2012) (T1216, 17W, Karen) – Category 5 super typhoon, strongest tropical cyclone worldwide in 2012, passed west of Japan and made landfall in South Korea.
- Tropical Storm Sanba (2018) (T1802, 02W, Basyang) – caused heavy rains, floods, and landslides across the southern and central Philippines.
- Tropical Storm Sanba (2023) (T2316, 16W) – a weak tropical storm that caused heavy rainfall in Hainan.

Preceded by Bolaven	Pacific typhoon season names Sanba	Succeeded by Jelawat
