= List of storms named Nesat =

The name Nesat (Khmer: នេសាទ, [neː.ˈsaːt]) has been used for four tropical cyclones in the West Pacific Ocean. The name, contributed by Cambodia, refers to fishing in Khmer.

- Typhoon Nesat (2005) (T0504, 04W, Dante) – a powerful typhoon which approached Japan but eventually stayed at sea.
- Typhoon Nesat (2011) (T1117, 20W, Pedring) – a strong typhoon that severely impacted the Philippines and South China.
- Typhoon Nesat (2017) (T1709, 11W, Gorio) – a typhoon that impacted Taiwan and East China.
- Typhoon Nesat (2022) (T2220, 23W, Neneng) – a typhoon that affected the Philippines, Taiwan and Vietnam.

Preceded by Sonca	Pacific typhoon season names Nesat	Succeeded by Haitang
