= List of storms named Fengshen =

The name Fengshen (Mandarin: 风神, [fɤŋ˥ ʂən˧˥]) has been used for five tropical cyclones in the western North Pacific Ocean. The name was contributed by China and literally means "god of wind" in Mandarin.

- Typhoon Fengshen (2002) (T0209, 12W) – Category 5 storm that remained over open waters for most of its life, then brushed southern Japan.
- Typhoon Fengshen (2008) (T0806, 07W, Frank) – Category 3 storm that wrecked the Philippines, capsizing the MV Princess of the Stars.
- Severe Tropical Storm Fengshen (2014) (T1414, 13W) – a storm which formed during the weak peak of the season.
- Typhoon Fengshen (2019) (T1925, 26W) – a late season Category 4 typhoon that remained at sea.
- Severe Tropical Storm Fengshen (2025) (T2524, 30W, Ramil) – a storm that brushed through the Philippines before it weakened over Vietnam.

Preceded by Nakri	Pacific typhoon season names Fengshen	Succeeded by Kalmaegi
