= List of storms named Bolaven =

The name Bolaven (Lao: ບໍລະເວນ, [bɔː˩ la˧ ʋeːn˦˥]) has been used for five tropical cyclones in the western North Pacific Ocean. The name was contributed by Laos and refers to Bolaven Plateau, located in the southern part of the country.

- Severe Tropical Storm Bolaven (2000) (T0006, 11W, Huaning) – crossed the Ryūkyū Islands and brushed southern Japan.
- Severe Tropical Storm Bolaven (2005) (T0523, 24W, Pepeng) – hit the Philippines as a tropical storm.
- Typhoon Bolaven (2012) (T1215, 16W, Julian) – a strong and costly typhoon which hit Korea and Okinawa.
- Tropical Storm Bolaven (2018) (T1801, 01W, Agaton) – traversed the Philippines and then dissipated east of Vietnam.
- Typhoon Bolaven (2023) (T2315, 15W) – a violent typhoon which passed close to Guam and eventually became a strong extratropical cyclone.

| Preceded by Koinu | Pacific typhoon season names Bolaven | Succeeded by Sanba |
