= List of storms named Halong =

The name Halong (Vietnamese: Hạ Long, [haː˧˨ʔ lawŋ͡m˧˧]) has been used for five tropical cyclones in the western North Pacific Ocean. The name was contributed by Vietnam and refers to Hạ Long Bay, a UNESCO World Heritage site and popular tourist destination in Northern Vietnam.

- Typhoon Halong (2002) (T0207, 10W, Inday) – a Category 4 super typhoon which struck Japan
- Severe Tropical Storm Halong (2008) (T0804, 05W, Cosme) – struck the Philippines
- Typhoon Halong (2014) (T1411, 11W, Jose) – a Category 5 super typhoon which caused heavy rain in the Philippines and struck Japan
- Typhoon Halong (2019) (T1923, 24W) – a Category 5 super typhoon which remained out at sea; the strongest cyclone worldwide in 2019
- Typhoon Halong (2025) (T2522, 28W) – a Category 4 typhoon which passed near the coast of Japan and struck the western coast of Alaska as a strong extratropical storm

Preceded by Matmo	Pacific typhoon season names Halong	Succeeded by Nakri
