= List of storms named Nina =

The names Nina and Niña have been used for 21 tropical cyclones worldwide. Eighteen occurred in the Western Pacific Ocean, including five in the Philippine Area of Responsibility, and one each occurred in the South Pacific Ocean, in the Australian region, and in the Central Pacific Ocean.

In the South Pacific:

- Cyclone Nina (1979) – a Category 1 tropical cyclone.

In the Australian region:

- Cyclone Nina (1992) – a Category 4 severe tropical cyclone that affected six Pacific island nations.

The name Nina was retired after the 1992–93 season.

In the Central Pacific:

- Hurricane Nina (1957) – a Category 1 hurricane that became the first hurricane to affect Kauaʻi at that intensity.

In the West Pacific:

- Typhoon Nina (1953) (T5307) – a Category 5-equivalent super typhoon that made landfall in China.
- Typhoon Nina (1960) (T6025, 51W) – a Category 3-equivalent typhoon.
- Tropical Depression Nina (1963)
- Typhoon Nina (1966) (T6607, 07W) – a Category 1-equivalent typhoon.
- Typhoon Nina (1968) (T6826, 31W, Seniang) – a Category 1-equivalent typhoon that affected the Philippines as a tropical storm.
- Tropical Storm Nina (1972) (T7204, 05W)
- Typhoon Nina (1975) (T7503, 04W, Bebeng) – a Category 4-equivalent super typhoon that contributed to the 1975 Banqiao Dam failure, killing at least 26,000 people.
- Tropical Storm Nina (1978) (T7823, 24W, Yaning) – a severe tropical storm that killed 59 people in the Philippines.
- Tropical Storm Nina (1981) (T8109, 09W, Ibiang) – made landfall in China.
- Tropical Storm Nina (1984) (T8415, 18W) – was absorbed into Tropical Storm Maury in a Fujiwhara interaction.
- Typhoon Nina (1987) (T8722, 22W, Sisang) – a Category 5-equivalent super typhoon that caused approximately 1,000 fatalities in the Philippines.
- Tropical Storm Nina (1992) (T9213, 14W) – did not affect land.
- Tropical Storm Nina (1995) (T9511, 15W, Helming) – affected the Philippines.
- Typhoon Krovanh (2003) (T0312, 12W, Niña) – a Category 2-equivalent typhoon that made landfall on Luzon, on Hainan, and in Vietnam.
- Typhoon Songda (2004) (T0418, 22W, Nina) – a Category 4-equivalent typhoon that made landfall in Nagasaki, becoming one of the costliest Pacific typhoons on record.
- Typhoon Hagupit (2008) (T0814, 18W, Nina) – a Category 4-equivalent typhoon that caused over 100 fatalities across multiple countries.
- Typhoon Prapiroon (2012) (T1221, 22W, Nina) – a Category 3-equivalent typhoon.
- Typhoon Nock-ten (2016) (T1626, 30W, Nina) – a Category 5-equivalent super typhoon that made eight landfalls in the Philippines.

The name Nina was retired following the 2016 Pacific typhoon season and was replaced with Nika.
