= Onyok =

Onyok may refer to

- Typhoon Onyok in the Western Pacific
- Onyok Pineda (born 2010), Filipino child actor
- Mansueto Velasco (born 1974), also known as Onyok Velasco, Filipino boxer
