= Typhoon Krovanh (2003) =

Pacific typhoon in 2003

Typhoon Krovanh (Niña)
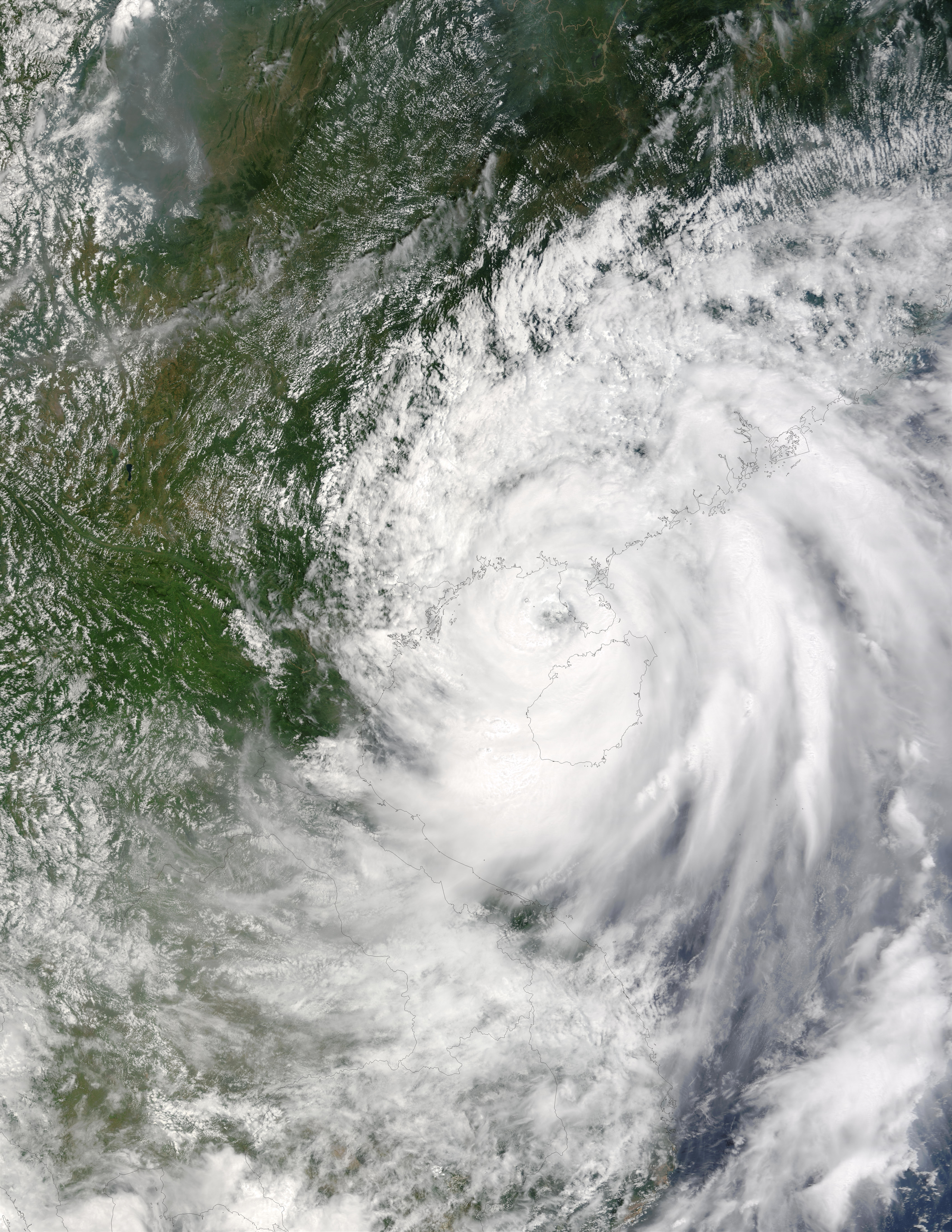
- Typhoon Krovanh at peak intensity on August 25

Meteorological history
- Formed: August 13, 2003
- Remnant low: August 18–20, 2003
- Dissipated: August 26, 2003

Typhoon
- 10-minute sustained (JMA)
- Highest winds: 120 km/h (75 mph)
- Lowest pressure: 970 hPa (mbar); 28.64 inHg

Category 2-equivalent typhoon
- 1-minute sustained (SSHWS/JTWC)
- Highest winds: 165 km/h (105 mph)
- Lowest pressure: 954 hPa (mbar); 28.17 inHg

Overall effects
- Fatalities: 4 total
- Damage: $253 million (2003 USD)
- Areas affected: Philippines; China; Vietnam
- IBTrACS
- Part of the 2003 Pacific typhoon season

Typhoon Krovanh, known in the Philippines as Typhoon Niña, (Note: The PAGASA assigns names to tropical cyclones that enter their area of responsibility, regardless of its official JMA designation. This name is used locally and for PAGASA tropical cyclone monitoring purposes.) was a moderate tropical cyclone that caused a swath of damage stretching from the Philippines to Vietnam in mid August 2003. The fifteenth named storm and sixth typhoon in the western Pacific that year, Krovanh originated from a tropical disturbance within the monsoon trough on August 13. Despite rather favorable conditions, the initial tropical depression did not intensify significantly and degenerated into a remnant low on August 18. However, these remnants were able to reorganize and the system was reclassified as a tropical cyclone a day later. Intensification was rather rapid upon the storm's reformation – the depression reached tropical storm status on August 20 and then typhoon intensity two days later. Shortly after, Krovanh made landfall on Luzon at peak intensity with winds of 120 km/h (75 mph). (Note: All assessments of maximum sustained winds are measured and averaged over 10 minutes unless otherwise noted.) The typhoon emerged into the South China Sea as a much weaker tropical storm, though it was able to restrengthen over warm waters. Once again at typhoon intensity, Krovanh clipped Haiyan before moving over the Leizhou Peninsula on its way to a final landfall near Cẩm Phả, Vietnam on August 25. Quick weakening due to land interaction occurred as Krovanh moved across northern Vietnam, where the storm met its demise the following day.

Krovanh first struck the Philippines, resulting in heavy rainfall and displacing approximately 1,000 families. The flooding caused severe damage and killed one person. In Hong Kong, eleven people were injured and isolated flooding occurred as a result of the typhoon's outer rainbands. However, Krovanh's effects were much more severe in China. Guangdong, Hainan, and Guangxi were the Chinese regions most extensively impacted. The typhoon brought record wind gusts into Guangxi. In those three regions combined, 13,000 homes were estimated to have collapsed and a large swath of farmland was damaged. Two people were killed in China and economic losses approximated at RMB¥2.1 billion (US$253 million). (Note: All damage totals are in 2003 United States dollars unless otherwise noted.) Due to its positioning and track, of all areas in Vietnam only the country's more northern regions were impacted by Krovanh. Flash flooding occurred in those regions, and 1,000 homes were flattened. One person was killed and five others were injured in Vietnam. Overall, the typhoon was responsible for the deaths of four persons.

== Meteorological history ==
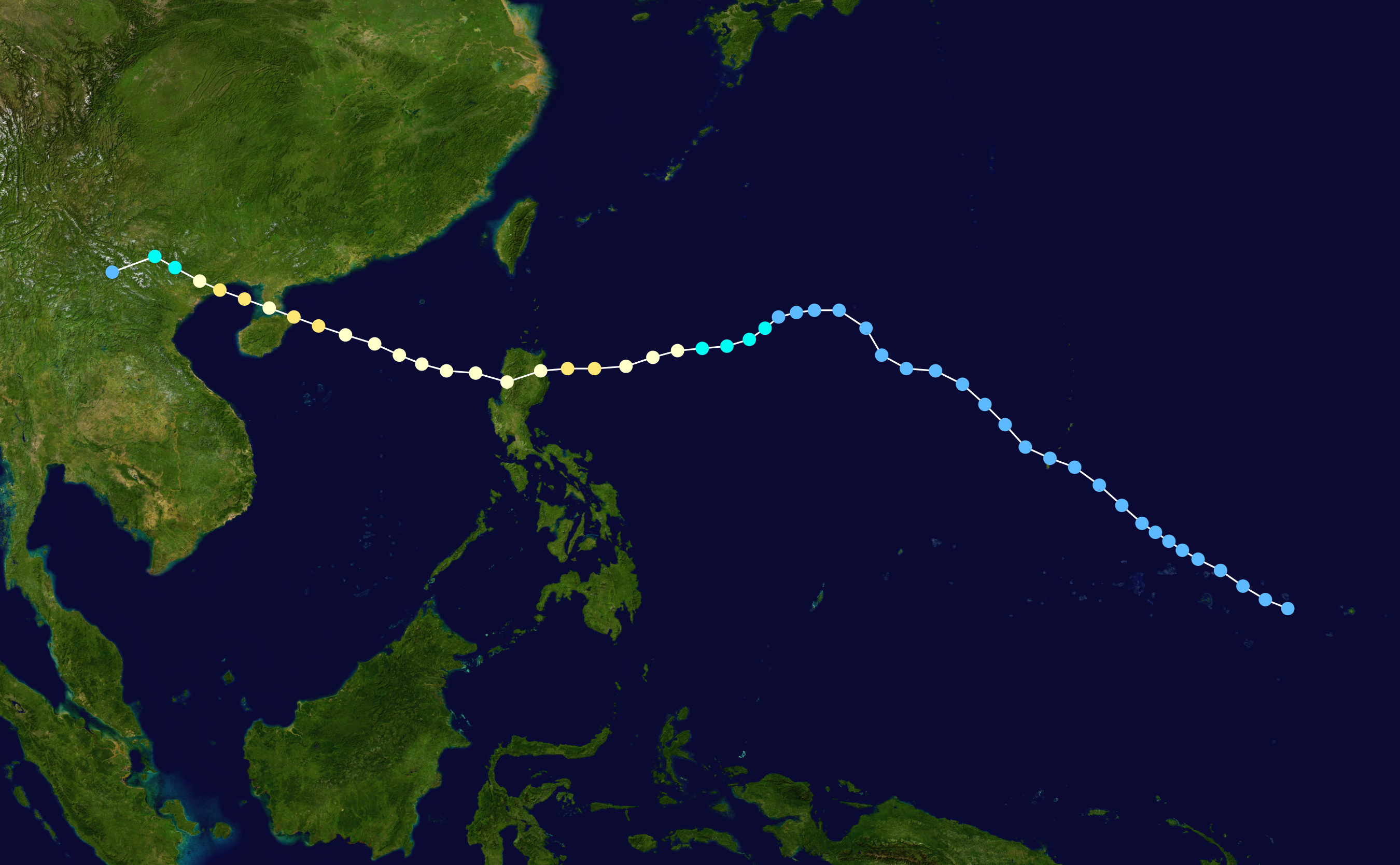
Map plotting the storm's track and intensity, according to the Saffir–Simpson scale Map key Saffir–Simpson scale Tropical depression (≤38 mph, ≤62 km/h) Tropical storm (39–73 mph, 63–118 km/h) Category 1 (74–95 mph, 119–153 km/h) Category 2 (96–110 mph, 154–177 km/h) Category 3 (111–129 mph, 178–208 km/h) Category 4 (130–156 mph, 209–251 km/h) Category 5 (≥157 mph, ≥252 km/h) Unknown Storm type Tropical cyclone Subtropical cyclone Extratropical cyclone, remnant low, tropical disturbance, or monsoon depression

The origin of Typhoon Krovanh can be traced back to an area of persistent convection well east of Chuuk State on August 13. Over the course of the day the disturbance gradually consolidated within favorable atmospheric conditions, and at 1800 UTC that day the Japan Meteorological Agency (JMA) assessed the system to have organized sufficiently to be classified as a tropical depression. Shower activity was suppressed by a nearby upper-level low for much of the storm's early existence; however, at 0600 UTC on August 15, the system was classified by the Joint Typhoon Warning Center (JTWC) as a tropical depression. The depression tracked northwestward under the influence of a nearby ridge. Strengthening and development of the tropical cyclone was very minimal over the next few days, and on August 18, both tracking agencies discontinued monitoring the system due to the lack of an identifiable low-level circulation center.

Redevelopment of the disturbance was a possibility following its degeneration, and on August 19, convection once again increased, prompting the JTWC to resume monitoring the system as a tropical depression at 0900 UTC, with the JMA following suit nine hours later. Due to slight wind shear, the depression's circulation center remained slightly displaced from the stronger convection. At 0600 UTC on August 20, the JTWC determined that the disturbance had intensified to reach tropical storm status. Upon the 1200 UTC upgrade to such an intensity by the JMA, the tropical cyclone was assigned the name Krovanh. (Note: The name Krovanh (Khmer: ក្រវាញ, [krɑ.ˈʋaːɲ]) was contributed by Cambodia and means cardamom in Khmer.) Subsequently, following reclassification, Krovanh began to quickly intensify as it tracked in a somewhat southwest bearing. By August 21, the tropical storm had begun to develop a banding eye feature. At 0600 UTC that day, the JMA upgraded Krovanh to severe tropical storm intensity, whilst the JTWC indicated that the storm intensified into a typhoon. On August 22, the JMA reassessed Krovanh as a typhoon and determined that the storm had reached its peak intensity with winds of 120 km/h (75 mph). Meanwhile, the JTWC analyzed the storm to have peaked with one-minute sustained winds of 165 km/h (103 mph); this was followed by the storm making landfall on Luzon, just north of Palanan, Isabela, at 1115 UTC later that day.

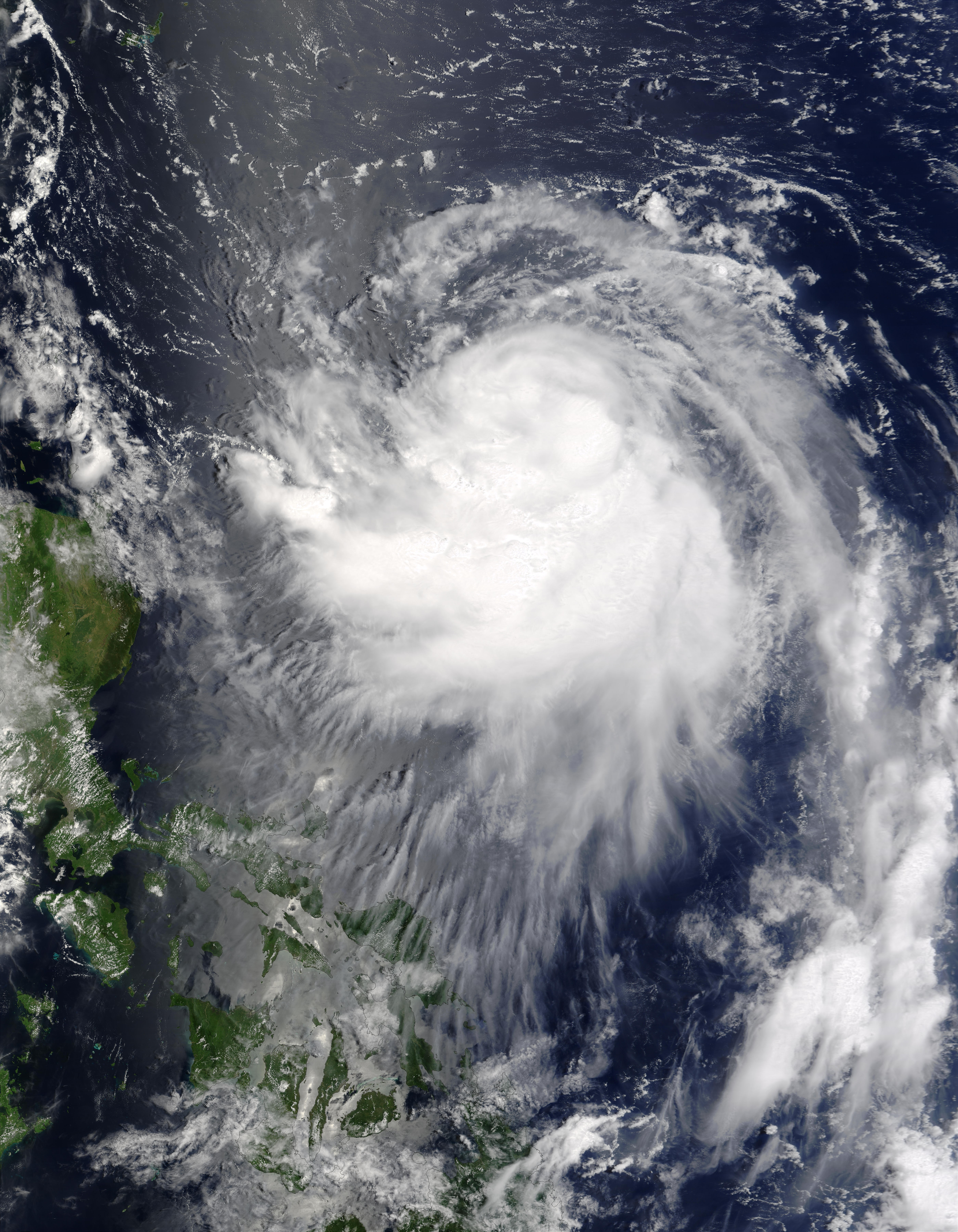
Tropical Storm Krovanh intensifying off the Philippines on August 21

Land interaction during Krovanh's passage of Luzon significantly weakened the cyclone, and upon the system's reemergence into the South China Sea by 2000 UTC on August 22, Krovanh was classified as only a tropical storm by the JMA. Redevelopment was rather rapid following emergence, and just four hours later the storm was redesignated as a severe tropical storm. On August 24, the storm began to develop tight banding and reformed its prior banding eye feature, which later organized into a well defined eye. Later that day Krovanh clipped the northeastern coast of Hainan before crossing the Leizhou Peninsula on August 25. During this time, the JMA upgraded Krovanh back to typhoon intensity and indicated that the storm was reaching a secondary peak in strength. The JTWC indicated a similar development as the typhoon traversed the Gulf of Tonkin. However, according to the JMA, Krovanh waned into a severe tropical storm shortly before the storm made its final landfall on Cẩm Phả, Vietnam at approximately 1500 UTC on August 25. Over land, Krovanh deteriorated rapidly, and both agencies ceased monitoring the system on August 26 while it was well northwest of Hanoi.

== Preparations and impact ==
=== Philippines ===
Striking Luzon in the Philippines on August 22, Krovanh brought heavy precipitation. Rainfall in the Philippines peaked at 342 mm (13.5 in) in Dagupan. Other high rainfall totals included 263 mm (10.4 in) in Baguio and 203 mm (8.0 in) in Iba, Zambales. The flooding rains displaced 1000 families on the archipelago and killed a girl. Although full damage reports were never released, damages were estimated at ₱ 4.3 million (US$73,000) and of "severe extent".

=== Taiwan ===
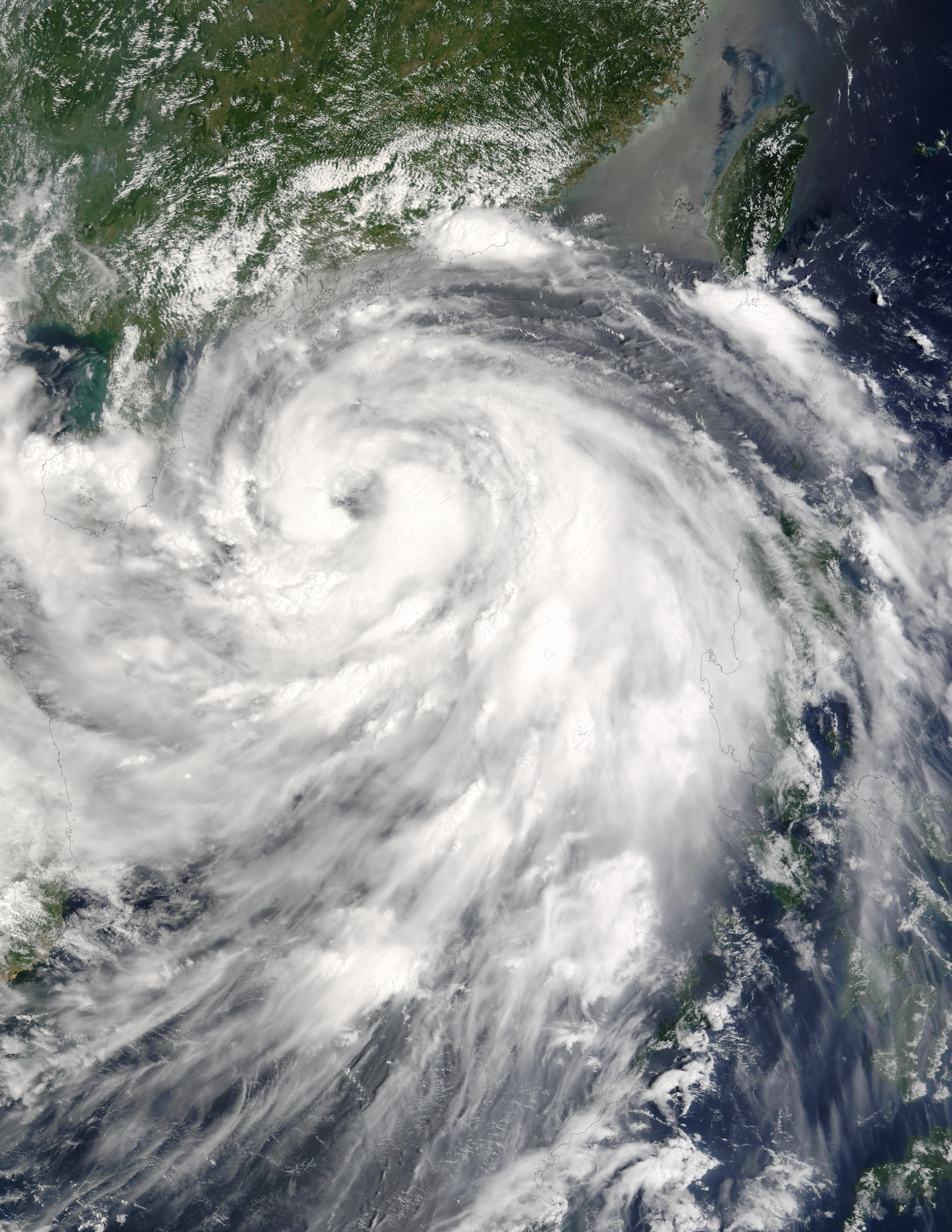
Tropical Storm Krovanh in the South China Sea on August 24

As Krovanh was approaching the Philippines, Taiwan's Central Weather Bureau cautioned the residents of the island against strong winds and warning ships in the Bashi Channel.

=== China mainland ===
After the typhoon entered the South China Sea, sea warnings were issued for areas offshore Hainan. Additional warnings were issued and expanded as Krovanh moved closer to the Chinese coast. In preparation for the storm, shipping routes across the Qiongzhou Strait were suspended, while security measures for river dykes and reservoirs were strengthened in both Hainan and Guangdong. In Guangzhou, 15 flights were cancelled in anticipation of Krovanh, stranding 500 passengers.

Guangdong and Hainan provinces, as well as Guangxi, were the regions of China most heavily impacted by Krovanh. In Zhanjiang, Guangdong, two people were killed. Economic losses from western Guangdong alone amounted to ¥1.2 billion (US$144 million). In Hainan, heavy rainfall was reported, peaking at 394 mm (15.5 in) in Jinjiang. Roughly 1,700 homes collapsed and 16 reservoirs were contaminated and destroyed. Widespread power outages occurred, impacting several neighborhoods. Strong winds also toppled coconut palms. Direct economic losses in the province totaled ¥683 million (US$82 million). Beihai City was the city most severely affected in Guangxi. Beginning on August 25, the entire population of Beihai temporarily suffered a water shortage. In the city alone, losses reached ¥988 million (US$119 million).In Weizhou Island, a weather station recorded a sustained wind speed of 151 km/h (94 mph) and a gust of 191 km/h (119 mph); this would be the strongest wind gust reported in Guangxi since 1982. Overall, a total of 13,000 residences collapsed and 140,000 ha (350,000 acres) of farmland were impacted across China. The total economic loss was in excess of ¥2.1 billion (US$253 million).

=== Hong Kong ===
In Hong Kong, the Hong Kong Observatory issued a Standby Signal No. 1 on August 23, which was upgraded to a Strong Wind Signal No. 3 at around noon the following day. All warning signals in Hong Kong were discontinued on August 25.

Krovanh's outer rainbands brought squally weather to the territory, coupled with strong winds. Rainfall in the Hong Kong area peaked at 232 mm (9.1 in) on High Island, much of which occurred on August 25. Other rainfall totals of at least 70 mm (2.8 in) were measured over a majority of the country. Gusts peaked at 144 km/h (89 mph) on Cheung Chau. The strong winds and gusts uprooted trees and caused scaffolding at an estate to collapse. In the province, 11 people were injured due to effects from Krovanh. A ferry service and four bus routes were temporarily suspended following the storm.

=== Vietnam ===
Typhoon Krovanh was the strongest tropical cyclone to affect Vietnam in 2003. A weather station in Móng Cái (Quảng Ninh) recorded a sustained wind speed of 90 km/h (56 mph) and a gust of 126 km/h (78 mph), while several other stations in Quảng Ninh, Hải Phòng and Hải Dương reported sustained tropical storm-force winds. One person was killed in Móng Cái after their house collapsed. Hundreds of other homes were unroofed and traffic was halted. Trees were also uprooted and power outages resulted from strong winds, particularly in Quảng Ninh Province. Heavy rains triggered flash flooding in northern Vietnam. Five additional persons were injured by flying debris. About 1,000 homes in Vietnam were flattened by the storm.

== See also ==
- Tropical cyclones in 2003
- Weather of 2003
- Other tropical cyclones named Krovanh
- Other tropical cyclones named Nina
- Typhoon Koryn (1993) – Strong tropical cyclone that struck Luzon before impacting the Guangdong region of China
- Tropical Storm Nock-ten (2011) – Caused widespread damage in Luzon and Hainan
- Typhoon Joe (1980) – Resulted in heavy damage in Vietnam after striking Hainan and Luzon
- Tropical Storm Ma-on – similar track in the same time in 2022
