= List of storms named Dujuan =

The name Dujuan (Mandarin: 杜鹃, [tu˥˩ t͡ɕyɛn˥]) has been used for five tropical cyclones in the western North Pacific Ocean. The name was contributed by China and means azalea in Mandarin.

- Typhoon Dujuan (2003) (T0313, 14W, Onyok) – hit near Hong Kong
- Severe Tropical Storm Dujuan (2009) (T0912, 13W, Labuyo) – did not affect land
- Typhoon Dujuan (2015) (T1521, 21W, Jenny) – a super typhoon which brought exceptionally strong winds to the Yaeyama Islands and Taiwan
- Tropical Storm Dujuan (2021) (T2101, 01W, Auring) – a weak tropical storm which brought heavy rains and flooding to the Philippines.
- Typhoon Dujuan (2026) (T2625, 24W) – a Category 1 typhoon that passed near the coast of Japan.

Preceded by Krovanh	Pacific typhoon season names Dujuan	Succeeded by Surigae
