= Typhoon Mekkhala (2026) =

Pacific typhoon in 2026

Typhoon Mekkhala (Francisco)
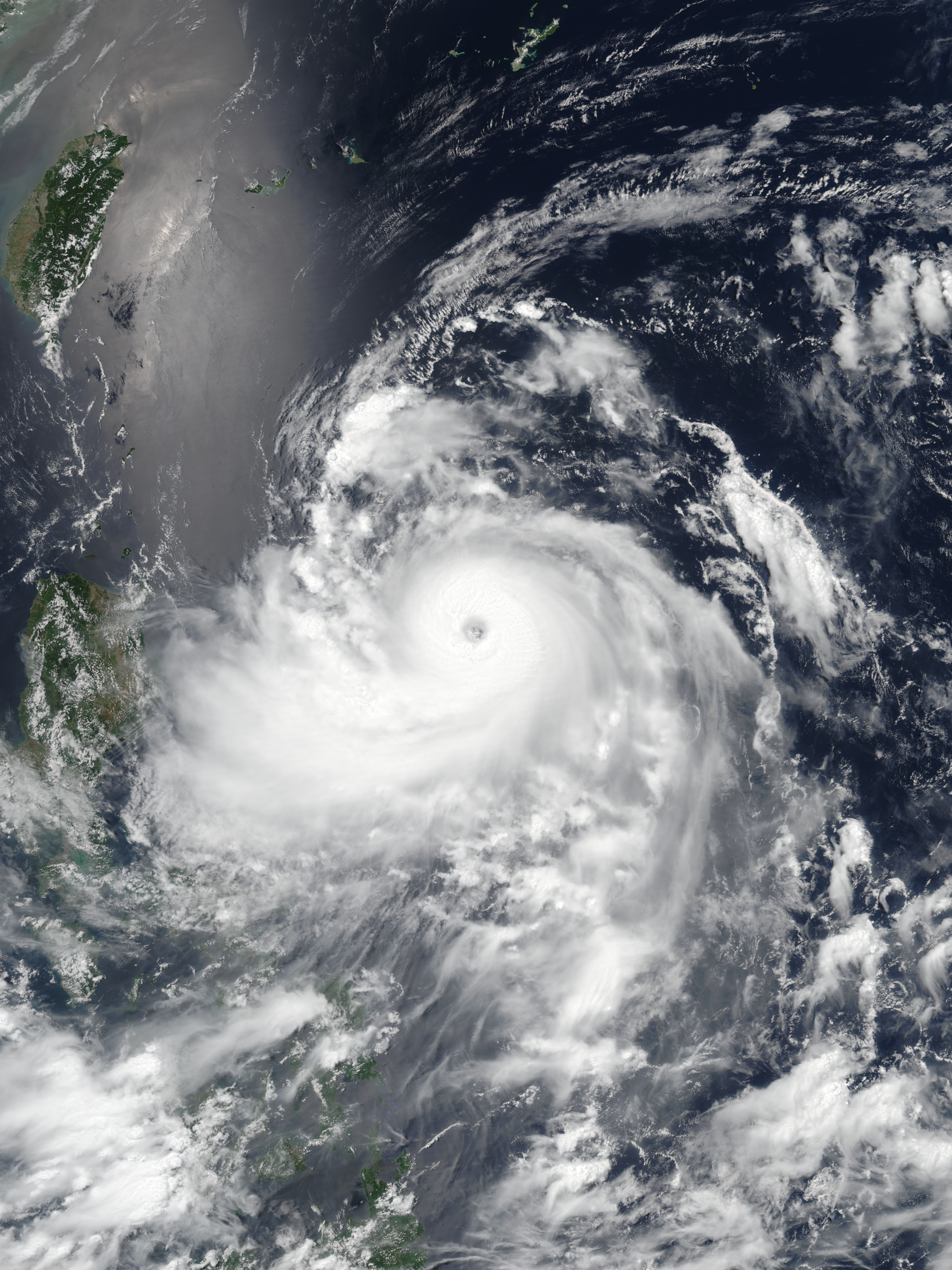
- Mekkhala at its peak intensity over the Philippine Sea on June 22

Meteorological history
- Formed: June 18, 2026
- Extratropical: June 27, 2026
- Dissipated: June 28, 2026

Very strong typhoon
- 10-minute sustained (JMA)
- Highest winds: 185 km/h (115 mph)
- Lowest pressure: 925 hPa (mbar); 27.32 inHg

Category 4-equivalent typhoon
- 1-minute sustained (SSHWS/JTWC)
- Highest winds: 230 km/h (145 mph)
- Lowest pressure: 934 hPa (mbar); 27.58 inHg

Overall effects
- Fatalities: 10
- Injuries: 5
- Missing: 1
- Damage: ≥$20.2 million (2026 USD)
- Areas affected: Caroline Islands, Mariana Islands, Philippines, Taiwan, Japan
- Part of the 2026 Pacific typhoon season

Typhoon Mekkhala, (Note: The name Mekkhala (Thai: เมขลา, [meːk˥˩ kʰa˧ laː˩˩˦]) was contributed by Thailand and refers to Manimekhala, a guardian angel of the seas in Thai.) was a powerful tropical cyclone that affected extreme northern Luzon in the Philippines before impacting Taiwan and Japan, including the Ryukyu Islands in late June 2026. It was the most intense tropical cyclone in the Western Pacific basin to occur in the month of June since Typhoon Guchol in 2012.

The seventh named storm and the second typhoon of the 2026 Pacific typhoon season, Mekkhala originated from a tropical disturbance that formed east-southeast of Guam. Initially assessed as having a low chance of development, the system gradually became better organized over the following days, prompting the Joint Typhoon Warning Center (JTWC) to designate it as Tropical Depression 07W on June 18. The following day, 07W was upgraded to a tropical storm, and the Japan Meteorological Agency (JMA) assigned the name Mekkhala. As the system continued to move northwestward, it entered the Philippine Area of Responsibility (PAR) on June 20, where the Philippine Atmospheric, Geophysical and Astronomical Services Administration (PAGASA) assigned it the name Francisco, the replacement name for Florita following its retirement after the 2022 season. Very favorable environmental conditions allowed Mekkhala to intensify into a severe tropical storm early on June 21 and into a typhoon later that day. The storm subsequently underwent rapid intensification, reaching Category 4-equivalent intensity after its maximum sustained winds increased by 50 knots (58 mph; 93 km/h) within a 24-hour period. Gradual weakening ensued thereafter, and Mekkhala weakened to a tropical storm on June 26 before lingering along the coast of Japan the following day. The JTWC ceased advisories later on June 27, while the JMA continued tracking the system until June 28.

== Meteorological history ==
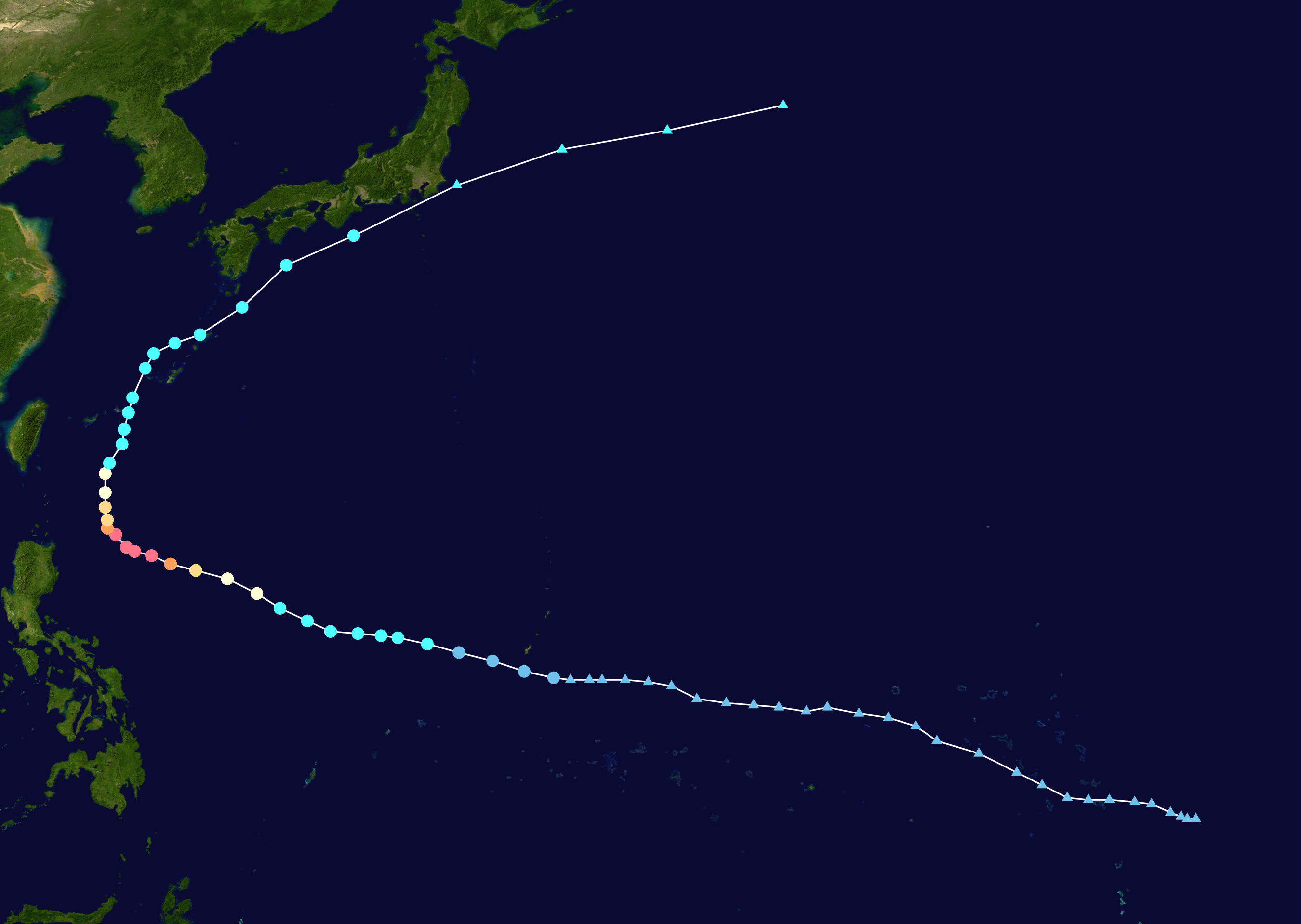
Map plotting the storm's track and intensity, according to the Saffir–Simpson scale Map key Saffir–Simpson scale Tropical depression (≤38 mph, ≤62 km/h) Tropical storm (39–73 mph, 63–118 km/h) Category 1 (74–95 mph, 119–153 km/h) Category 2 (96–110 mph, 154–177 km/h) Category 3 (111–129 mph, 178–208 km/h) Category 4 (130–156 mph, 209–251 km/h) Category 5 (≥157 mph, ≥252 km/h) Unknown Storm type Tropical cyclone Subtropical cyclone Extratropical cyclone, remnant low, tropical disturbance, or monsoon depression

On June 15, the JTWC recognized a disorganized low-pressure area that had formed 940 nautical miles (1,740 km) east-southeast of Guam, with satellite imagery indicating that the disturbance was in a marginal environment for tropical cyclogenesis. Three days later, at 12:00 UTC, the JTWC issued a Tropical Cyclone Formation Alert (TCFA) for the system, citing favorable conditions and a high potential of tropical cyclone formation over the next 12 to 24 hours. The JMA also classified the system as a tropical depression on the same day. Nine hours later, at 21:00 UTC, the JTWC upgraded the system to a tropical depression and assigned it the designation 07W. The system was then characterized by an exposed but compact low-level circulation center (LLCC) and deep convection confined to its southern periphery, while moving into a favorable environment with high sea surface temperatures (SSTs), high tropical cyclone heat potential (TCHP), weak vertical wind shear, and strong upper-level outflow. At 15:00 UTC on June 19, the JTWC upgraded the system to a tropical storm after satellite imagery showed a developing central dense overcast (CDO). The JMA followed suit shortly afterward, assigning the name Mekkhala. The storm then tracked westward along the southern periphery of a mid-level subtropical high.

On June 20, as Mekkhala began moving west-northwestward, animated multispectral satellite imagery (MSI) depicted cumulonimbus clusters assembling around the storm's cloud system center (CSC), which started forming a curved band. At 03:00 UTC, the JTWC reported that the storm had temporarily slowed due to a short-term wobble provoked by vortex precession, which disrupted the forward motion of the LLCC. The JMA noted that Mekkhala had maintained its intensity despite limited firmness, while water vapor imagery revealed the presence of dry air ahead of the storm's track. Environmental analysis indicated that conditions remained favorable for further intensification. At 22:00 PHT (14:00 UTC), Mekkhala entered the Philippine Area of Responsibility (PAR), where PAGASA assigned it the local name Francisco, in which the agency classified it as a severe tropical storm. By 15:00 UTC, the storm revealed an asymmetric wind field, while the vortex had become less elongated and some gale-force winds had appeared in the southeastern quadrant. Upper-level convection subsequently obscured the elongated LLCC, and intense convective bursts with cloud-top temperatures as cold as −90 °C (−130 °F) were observed in infrared imagery. Early on June 21, the JMA upgraded Mekkhala to a severe tropical storm as it moved west-northwestward. The storm was then depicted with increasingly defined spiral banding and strong convective bursts within the CDO. Later, animated MSI showed that Mekkhala possessed good cloud characteristics of anticyclonic outflow. At 14:00 PHT (06:00 UTC), PAGASA upgraded Mekkhala to a typhoon. The JTWC followed suit at 09:00 UTC owing to strong radial outflow, accompanying cirrus filaments, and well-defined spiral bands of deep convection. The JMA also followed suit three hours later. A microwave image showed that Mekkhala had developed a well-defined low-level microwave eye, which then also showed some active convective cloud clusters around the CSC. Thereafter, the storm attempted to form an eye as its convective spiral banding continued to wrap around the center; however, no discernible eye was able to persist at that time.

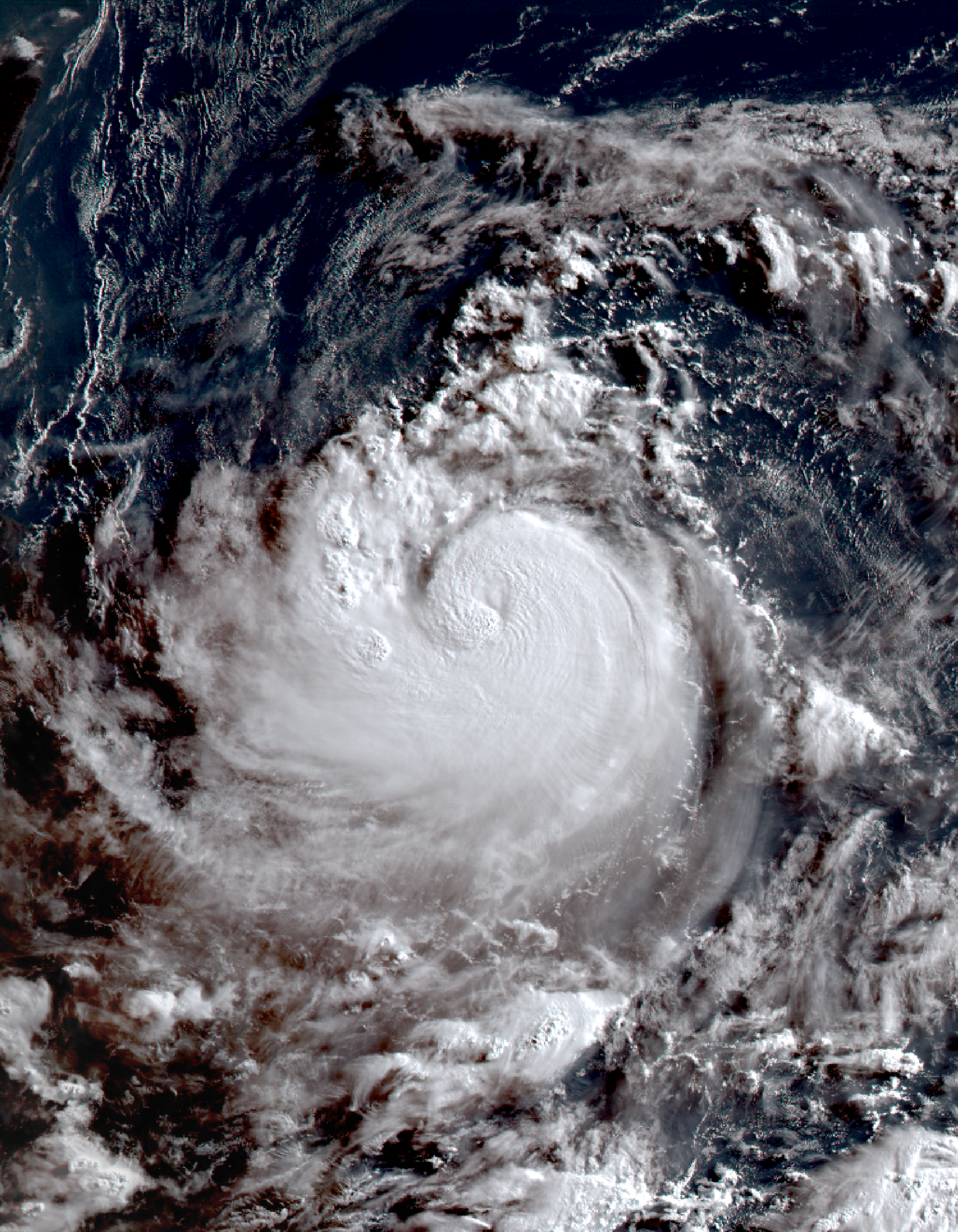
Mekkhala rapidly intensifying along the Philippine Sea on June 21

The following day, satellite imagery indicated that an eye had begun to emerge as Mekkhala started to undergo rapid intensification. As a result, the JTWC upgraded Mekkhala to a Category 3-equivalent typhoon at 03:00 UTC on June 22, estimating maximum one-minute sustained winds of 185 km/h (115 mph) and a minimum central pressure of 961 hPa (961 mbar), while MSI revealed a 15-nautical-mile-wide (28 km; 17 mi) eye. The JTWC further upgraded the storm to a Category 4-equivalent typhoon six hours later after Mekkhala's winds increased by 50 knots (58 mph; 93 km/h) within 24 hours. Later that day, PAGASA upgraded Mekkhala to a super typhoon after estimating that it had attained maximum sustained winds of 185 km/h (115 mph). Despite having good positional accuracy, the typhoon started to transit into a neutral environment at 18:00 UTC, as a result of increased vertical wind shear. Although Mekkhala continued to intensify slightly and reached its peak intensity at 21:00 UTC, satellite imagery indicated a degraded convective structure, with erosion of the northern portion of the CDO and an increasingly ragged, cooling eye. Gradual weakening ensued on June 23 as Mekkhala slowly moved into more unfavorable conditions, characterized by enhanced upwelling of cooler waters combined with moderate north-northeasterly wind shear of 20 to 25 knots (37 to 46 km/h; 23 to 29 mph). By 12:00 UTC, animated MSI indicated that Mekkhala's eye had become obscured. Water vapor imagery showed that Mekkhala lacked poleward outflow aloft, while the absence of microwave imagery precluded a more thorough analysis of the storm's degrading structure. By 21:00 UTC, as the typhoon was located 412 nautical miles (763 km) south-southwest of Kadena Air Base, enhanced infrared satellite imagery indicated that Mekkhala no longer depicted an eye, while the northern periphery of its LLCC had become progressively exposed.

On June 24, Mekkhala moved northward between two mid-level subtropical highs and began to weaken as environmental conditions became insufficient to maintain its intensity. At 03:00 UTC, high-resolution MSI depicted multiple vortices rotating within an exposed low- to mid-level inner core, representing the remnants of the former eyewall. Mekkhala then tracked north-northwestward into a hostile environment characterized by warm SSTs offset by strong vertical wind shear. Persistent northeasterly vertical wind shear prevented deep convection from wrapping around the northern semicircle of the circulation. Microwave imagery revealed symmetric low- to mid-level cloud bands wrapping into the core, confirming that the storm's deep convection had become asymmetric. At 18:00 UTC, the JMA downgraded Mekkhala to a severe tropical storm as strong wind shear and dry air continued to weaken the system. Three hours later, the JTWC followed suit, downgrading Mekkhala to a tropical storm as its LLCC became increasingly decoupled from the disorganized convective bursts concentrated over the southern semicircle of the system, while dry-air entrainment contributed to the storm's asymmetric structure. On June 25, the storm turned northeastward along the northwestern periphery of a mid-level subtropical high, while its upper-level convection continued to decouple and become displaced to the southeast. Early on June 26, the JMA downgraded Mekkhala to a tropical storm while it remained in an unfavorable environment for further development. Mekkhala then scraped the coast of Japan while interacting with Tropical Storm Higos, as it moved northwestward as a tropical storm. On June 27, the JTWC issued its final advisory on Mekkhala as the storm completed its transition into an extratropical cyclone., Mekkhala dissipated over the North Pacific ocean on June 28th.

== Preparations and impact ==
=== Philippines ===
As Mekkhala moved closer to the country, PAGASA raised Tropical Cyclone Warning Signal No. 1 over Batanes, the eastern portion of the Babuyan Islands, and the northeastern portion of Cagayan. Despite the low likelihood of the storm making landfall, PAGASA warned that its trough could bring cloudy skies with scattered rains and thunderstorms over the Bicol Region. On June 22, Chief of the Philippine National Police (PNP) Jose Melencio Nartatez Jr. stated that police personnel had been placed on alert status to safeguard residents in areas threatened by Mekkhala, while coordinating with local government units on preemptive evacuations and disaster response operations. The Department of Social Welfare and Development (DSWD) prepositioned 114,000 family food packs across local government units in Cagayan Valley in preparation for Mekkhala. In addition, the agency stored 96,000 family food packs and household kits in regional warehouses and set aside ₱3 million (US$49,150.51) in standby funds for the emergency procurement of additional supplies.

=== Taiwan ===
The outer bands of Mekkhala and a late monsoon produced heavy rainfall over Taiwan. Government offices and schools were closed, affecting more than five million people. A rainfall amount of 250 millimetres (9.8 in) within six hours was recorded in Tainan. Nearly a quarter of the average annual rainfall amount of 2,500 millimetres (98 in) Kaohsiung fell within 24 hours. A total of 487 flood incidents were reported across Taiwan. Flooding was reported to be the worst in some areas since Typhoon Morakot in 2009. A levee designed to withstand a 25-year flood was overtopped along the Sanyeh River in Tainan, entering several houses. Flooding also occurred in several villages in Wandan Township after a levee overflowed in Pingtung County. Hualien County officials ordered the evacuation of more than 200 people downstream from a flooded lake. A motorcycle shop in Taipei suffered roughly NT$300,000 to NT$400,000 in flood damage. Affected neighborhoods in Taipei were offered upwards of NT$10,000 in payouts. Mekkhala resulted in agricultural losses of NT$615.6 million (US$19.3 million) across Taiwan. A total of 1,712 hectares (4,230 acres) of farmland was damaged including 419 hectares (1,035 acres) where harvest failed. Guava crops were the most affected by flooding with losses of 231 hectares (571 acres). Livestock damage was tabulated at NT$10.15 million (US$318,842) and damage to agriculture was tabulated at NT$35.08 million (US$332,349).

A 73-year old woman was killed in Kaohsiung after falling into a drainage ditch. Another woman was killed in Zhubei after her vehicle was swept away by flooding. Saturated grounds caused by Mekkhala resulted in a rockslide in Taichung's Heping District on June 28, killing four hikers on the Butterfly Valley Waterfall Trail. Another hiker suffered minor injuries. The Forestry and Nature Conservation Agency stated that the trail remained open since the rainfall from Mekkhala was determined to be insufficient for closure.

=== Japan ===
An elderly man was confirmed dead after a landslide in Yamaguchi Prefecture. Two people died in Ehime Prefecture, with another was rescued in the Kamo River. Flooding caused a reservoir in Hiroshima Prefecture to burst its banks, which affected 10 homes. A 13-meter tall cherry tree was toppled in Koganei, Tokyo, while a 12 m (39 ft) cherry tree fell along the Seibu Shinjuku Line in Nerima, Tokyo. Meanwhile, in Shizuoka Prefecture, some roads in Shimoda became inundated. A ground collapse occurred in a former coal mining area in Tagawa of Fukuoka Prefecture, prompting nearby residents to evacuate. The Kōtoku-in, a Buddhist temple in Kamakura, temporarily closed, along with nearby restaurants of the surrounding area. In Ikoma of Nara Prefecture, a river overflowed and nearby homes were flooded above floor level, while water gushed from multiple manholes in Ikuno, Osaka. A road collapsed in Sasebo of Nagasaki Prefecture, with asphalt and guardrails falling away. A 15 m (49 ft) long stone wall collapsed in a private home in Suwa of Nagano Prefecture. Part of a hillside in Ōtsu of Shiga Prefecture gave way, sending soil, and debris into two homes and nearby roads. A 72-year old newspaper delivery worker was found dead in an irrigation channel in Awaji of Hyōgo Prefecture.

== See also ==
- Weather of 2026
- Tropical cyclones in 2026
- Typhoon Mindulle (2004)
- Typhoon Guchol (2012) - the last major typhoon to occur in June; also struck Japan
- Typhoon Neoguri (2014) - followed a similar trajectory
- Typhoon Goni (2015)
