= List of storms named Krovanh =

The name Krovanh (Khmer: ក្រវាញ, [krɑ.ˈʋaːɲ]) has been used for five tropical cyclones in the western North Pacific Ocean. The name was contributed by Cambodia and means cardamom in Khmer.

- Typhoon Krovanh (2003) (T0312, 12W, Niña), struck the Philippines and China
- Severe Tropical Storm Krovanh (2009) (T0911, 12W), did not affect land
- Typhoon Krovanh (2015) (T1520, 20W), a strong typhoon that never affect land
- Tropical Storm Krovanh (2020) (T2023, 26W, Vicky), a weak tropical cyclone that caused flashfloods in Mindanao.
- Tropical Storm Krovanh (2026) (T2624, 22W, Pilandok), – a weak and erratic tropical storm that struck Japan.

Preceded by Bang-Lang	Pacific typhoon season names Krovanh	Succeeded by Dujuan
