= Typhoon Dujuan (2003) =

Pacific typhoon in 2003

Typhoon Dujuan (Onyok)
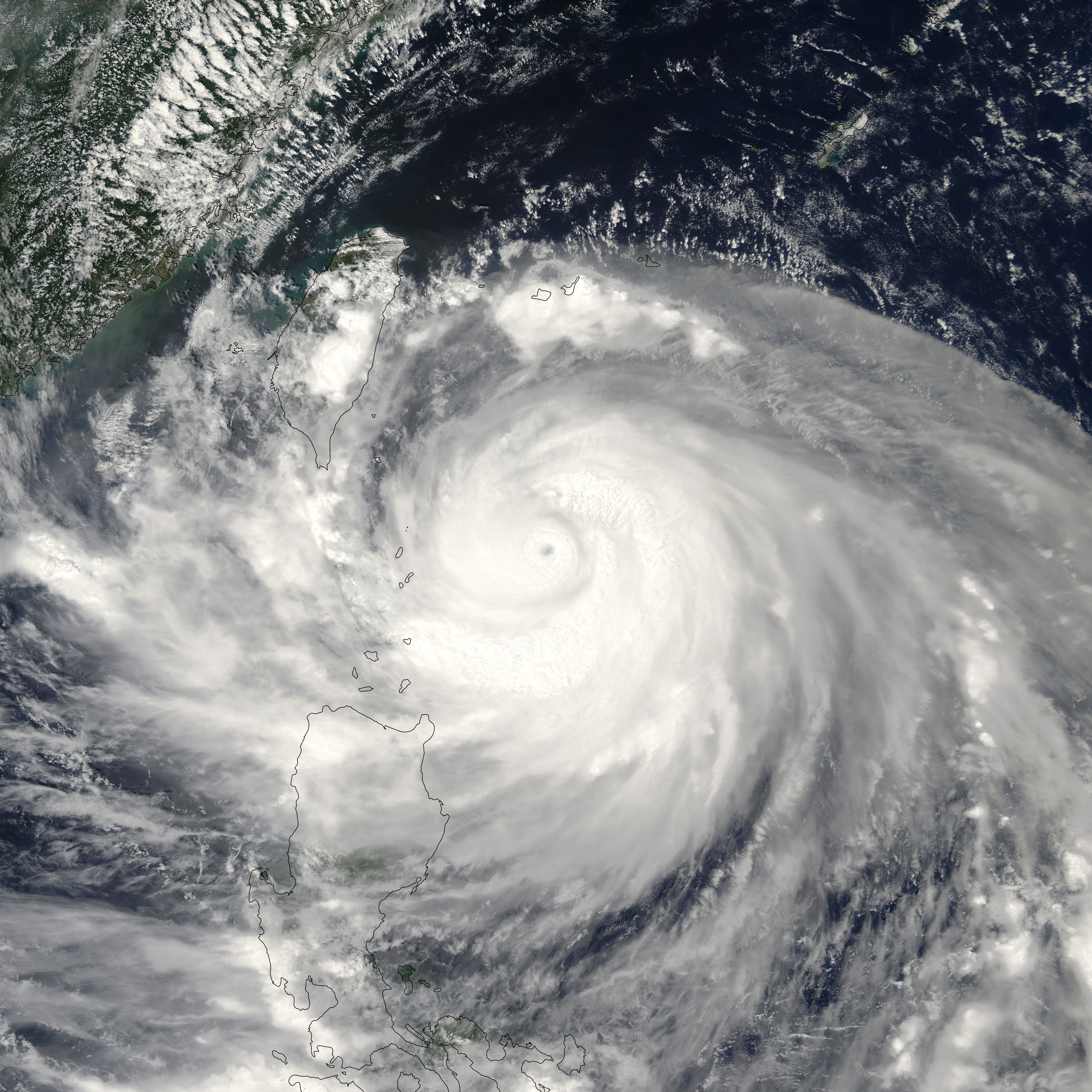
- Typhoon Dujuan near peak intensity on September 1

Meteorological history
- Formed: August 27, 2003
- Dissipated: September 3, 2003

Typhoon
- 10-minute sustained (JMA)
- Highest winds: 150 km/h (90 mph)
- Lowest pressure: 950 hPa (mbar); 28.05 inHg

Category 4-equivalent typhoon
- 1-minute sustained (SSHWS/JTWC)
- Highest winds: 230 km/h (145 mph)
- Lowest pressure: 916 hPa (mbar); 27.05 inHg

Overall effects
- Fatalities: 44
- Damage: $392 million (2003 USD)
- Areas affected: Philippines, Okinawa, Taiwan, China
- IBTrACS
- Part of the 2003 Pacific typhoon season

Typhoon Dujuan, known in the Philippines as Typhoon Onyok, was the strongest tropical cyclone to strike the Pearl River delta since Typhoon Hope in 1979. The 13th storm and 7th typhoon of the 2003 Pacific typhoon season, Dujuan developed on August 27 to the east of Taiwan. It initially moved to the northwest, slowly intensifying into a tropical storm while drawing moisture and rainfall over the Philippines. On the island of Luzon, one person was killed and areas were flooded. Dujuan quickly intensified after turning and moving quicker to the west-northwest, developing an eye. It reached peak winds of 150 km/h (93 mph) on September 1, and shortly thereafter passed just south of Taiwan. There, Dujuan left 590,000 people without power, killed three, and caused NT$200 million (NWD, $115 million USD) in crop damage. (Note: All damage totals are in 2003 values of their respective currencies.) While moving through the South China Sea, the typhoon developed concentric eyewalls. Dujuan weakened to severe tropical storm status before making landfall on September 2 in southern China, just east of Hong Kong near Shenzhen, Guangdong. The storm dissipated the next day after causing 40 deaths and ¥2.3 billion (CNY, US$277 million) in damage. Most of the deaths were in Shenzhen where the storm moved ashore, and the city experienced a near-total power outage.

== Meteorological history ==
Map plotting the storm's track and intensity, according to the Saffir–Simpson scale Map key Saffir–Simpson scale Tropical depression (≤38 mph, ≤62 km/h) Tropical storm (39–73 mph, 63–118 km/h) Category 1 (74–95 mph, 119–153 km/h) Category 2 (96–110 mph, 154–177 km/h) Category 3 (111–129 mph, 178–208 km/h) Category 4 (130–156 mph, 209–251 km/h) Category 5 (≥157 mph, ≥252 km/h) Unknown Storm type Tropical cyclone Subtropical cyclone Extratropical cyclone, remnant low, tropical disturbance, or monsoon depression

On August 25, an area of convection persisted on satellite imagery on August 25. The thunderstorms pulsed and became better organized by August 27. That day, the Japan Meteorological Agency (JMA) (Note: The Japan Meteorological Agency is the official Regional Specialized Meteorological Center for the western Pacific Ocean.) estimated that a tropical depression formed southeast of the Japanese island of Okinotorishima, or about 520 km (320 mi) northwest of Guam. The Joint Typhoon Warning Center (JTWC) (Note: The Joint Typhoon Warning Center is a joint United States Navy – United States Air Force task force that issues tropical cyclone warnings for the western Pacific Ocean and other regions.) also estimated a tropical cyclone formed on August 27. With a ridge to the north, the depression tracked slowly to the southwest. The system gradually organized while developing improved outflow to the south, although a tropical upper tropospheric trough to the north caused wind shear. On August 29, the JMA upgraded the depression to a tropical storm named Dujuan, (Note: The name Dujuan (Mandarin: 杜鹃, [tu˥˩ t͡ɕyɛn˥]) was contributed by China and means azalea in Mandarin.) although the JTWC had upgraded a day prior. That day, the Philippine Atmospheric, Geophysical and Astronomical Services Administration (PAGASA) began issuing advisories as the storm approached the region, naming it Onyok.

Shortly after it was named, Dujuan quickly intensified after an upper-level low to the northwest improved outflow to the north. On August 30, the ridge to the north built eastward, causing the storm to slow and turn more to the northwest. That day, an eye developed in center, and the JMA upgraded Dujuan to typhoon status. Subsequently, the typhoon accelerated to the west-northwest and later to the west. On September 1, the JMA estimated Dujuan attained peak 10–minute sustained winds of 150 km/h (93 mph). Around the same time, the JTWC assessed peak 1–minute winds of 230 km/h (140 mph), making it the equivalent of a Category 4 on the Saffir-Simpson hurricane wind scale. While near peak intensity, the center of Dujuan passed about 45 km (28 mi) south of the southern tip of Taiwan. While moving westward through the South China Sea, the typhoon weakened slightly after its peak intensity due to an eyewall replacement cycle. Radar from the Hong Kong Observatory indicated an inner eye about 20 km (12 mi) in diameter, and an outer eye about 100 km (62 mi) in diameter. At around 1200 UTC on September 2, Dujuan made landfall just east of Hong Kong, near Shenzhen. The JMA estimated the typhoon had weakened into a severe tropical storm by the time of landfall, while the JTWC estimated winds of 185 km/h (115 mph). It was considered the strongest typhoon to strike the Pearl River Delta since Typhoon Hope in 1979. Dujuan rapidly weakened while continuing westward through China, dissipating on September 3 over Guangxi.

== Preparations and impact ==
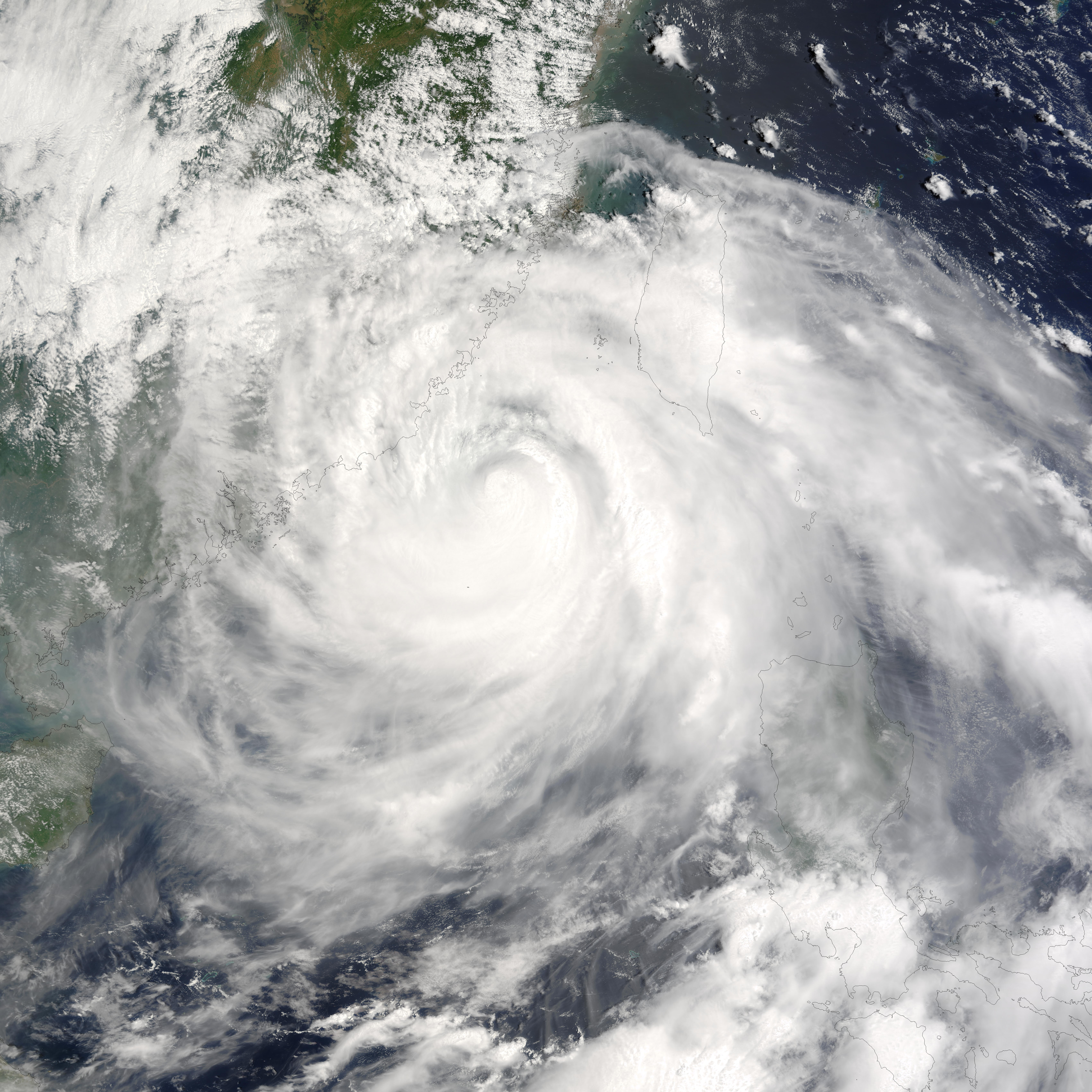
Typhoon Dujuan approaching South China on September 2

Although the center passed north of Luzon in the Philippines, Dujuan interacted with the monsoon to produce heavy rainfall over the country. Flash flooding in Metro Manila covered roads, causing traffic jams. Dangerous conditions caused many schools to close. The typhoon destroyed one house, and one person was killed in the country. While in the vicinity, Dujuan produced gusts of 100 km/h (62 mph) on Yonaguni, a Japanese subdivision of Okinawa. Strong winds and high waves disrupted marine and airline traffic, with two flights canceled. Rainfall on Okinawa reached about 18 mm (0.71 in).

On August 31, officials in Taiwan issued a sea warning, advising for boats to avoid the Bashi Channel. Schools in southern Taiwan were closed, and transport was disrupted. The Ministry of National Defense canceled a military exercise due to the storm. In Taiwan, the typhoon dropped heavy rainfall that reached 628 mm (24.7 in) in Pingtung County, and several other locations reported over 200 mm (7.9 in). Sustained winds reached 176 km/h (109 mph) on Orchid Island offshore southeastern Taiwan, where gale-force winds were recorded for 13 hours and gusts reached 271 km/h (168 mph). The typhoon was so strong that it destroyed the anemometer there. On the island of Taiwan, winds peaked at 87 km/h (54 mph) at Dongshi, while gusts peaked at 184 km/h (114 mph) in a mountainous region of Nantou County. The typhoon left about 590,000 people without power at some point on the island. Transport was disrupted, and there was about NT$200 million (TWD, US$115 million). (Note: The total was originally reported in New Taiwan dollars. Total converted via the Oanda Corporation website.) Dujuan killed three people and injured eight in southern Taiwan; one was a drowning in the Penghu islands, and another occurred when a man was blown out of his window in Taipei.

Before Dujuan made its final landfall, the Hong Kong Observatory initially issued a standby warning signal, and eventually raised it to a number 9 signal, the second-highest out of 10, for the first time since Typhoon York in 1999. The threat of the storm caused 360 flights to be canceled or delayed at Hong Kong International Airport, and the Hong Kong Stock Exchange was closed. Officials opened 27 shelters for residents, housing over 120 people. Winds in the territory briefly reached typhoon status, or 120 km/h (75 mph), at Lau Fau Shan. Rainfall reached over 90 mm (3.5 in) on Lantau Island. Dujuan caused minor flooding and two small landslides In Hong Kong, the typhoon knocked down 85 trees and caused a power outage affecting 300 people in Yuen Long. Dujuan injured 24 people in the territory, and four fishermen were missing and presumed drowned after their boat sank. Despite the close passage, damage was minor in Hong Kong. During the height of the storm, three people stole $1.3 million (USD) worth of jewelry, watches, and clothing from a store.

In mainland China, Dujuan produced 183 mm (7.2 in) of rainfall in Puning in Guangdong, of which 131 mm (5.2 in) fell in 24 hours. In Fujian province, winds reached 144 km/h (89 mph) in Quanzhou, and in Guangdong, winds peaked at 179 km/h (111 mph) in Shenzhen. In Shenzhen near where Dujuan made landfall, 90% of residents lost power, after strong winds knocked down power lines, although it was quickly restored. Also in the city, 20 people were killed, 16 of whom due to the collapse of a half-finished building that they were constructing. Officials had opened 272 emergency shelters before the storm's arrival, housing 4,950 people. In Huizhou, nine people were killed, and another three people died in Shanwei from the storm. Across Guangdong, the typhoon damaged roads, water and power systems, and telecommunication networks. About 139,000 ha (340,000 acres) of crops were damaged in the province, and 54,000 homes were destroyed. In Macau, 30 flights were delayed at Macau International Airport, and two bridges were closed. In Fuzhou in Fujian province, the storm knocked down 500 trees. Overall damage in China was estimated at ¥2.3 billion (CNY, US$277 million), (Note: The total was originally reported in Chinese yuan. Total converted via the Oanda Corporation website.) and across Guangdong, the typhoon injured about 1,000 people and killed 40 people.

== See also ==
- Tropical cyclones in 2003
- Weather of 2003
- Other tropical cyclones named Dujuan
- Other tropical cyclones named Onyok
- Typhoon Usagi (2013)
- Typhoon Dujuan (2015)
