= Tropical Storm Ma-on =

Pacific severe tropical storm in 2022

Severe Tropical Storm Ma-on (Florita)
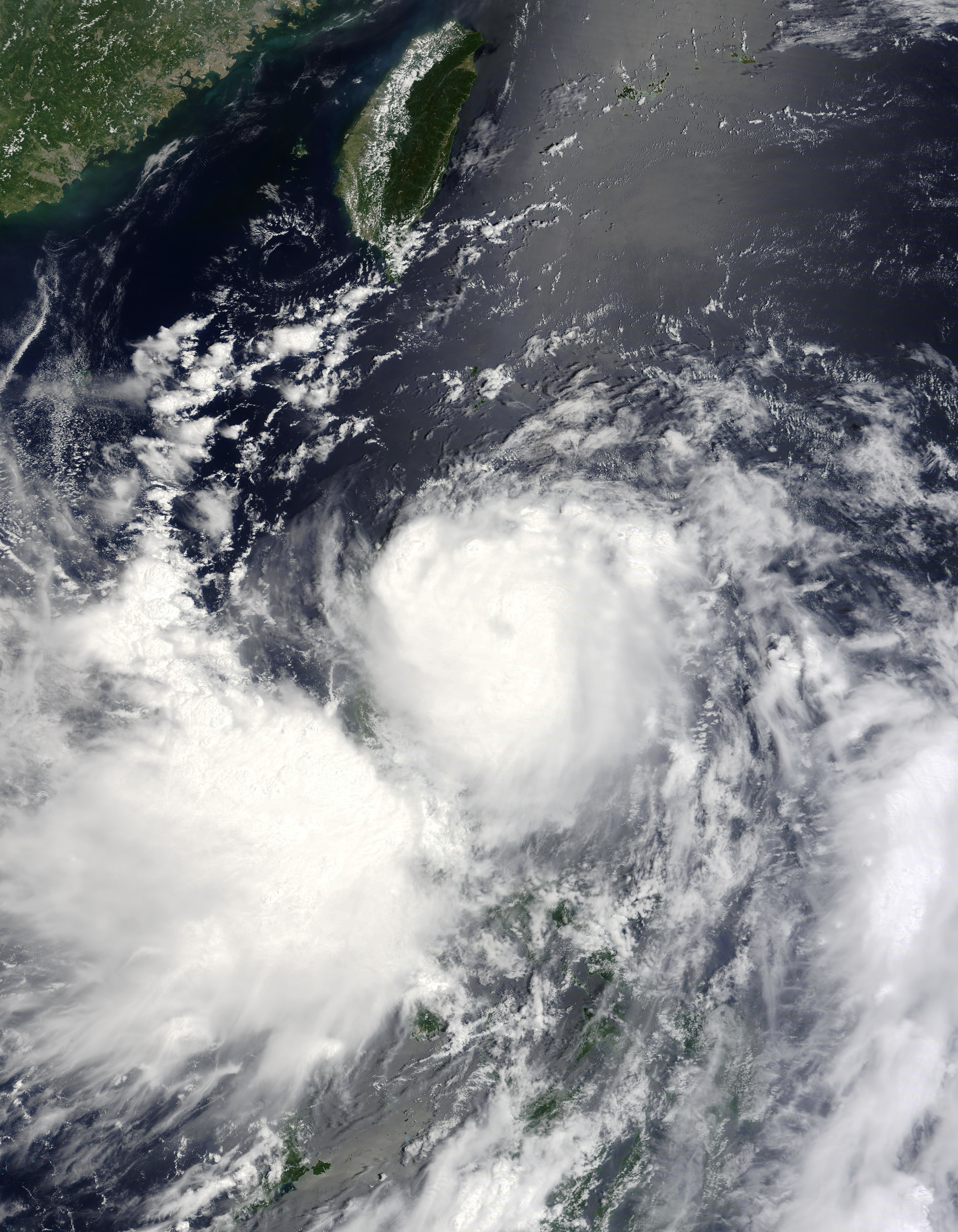
- Severe Tropical Storm Ma-on approaching Luzon at peak intensity on August 24

Meteorological history
- Formed: August 20, 2022
- Dissipated: August 26, 2022

Severe tropical storm
- 10-minute sustained (JMA)
- Highest winds: 100 km/h (65 mph)
- Lowest pressure: 980 hPa (mbar); 28.94 inHg

Category 1-equivalent typhoon
- 1-minute sustained (SSHWS/JTWC)
- Highest winds: 120 km/h (75 mph)
- Lowest pressure: 984 hPa (mbar); 29.06 inHg

Overall effects
- Fatalities: 7
- Damage: $66.6 million (2022 USD)
- Areas affected: Philippines; China; Vietnam; Laos
- IBTrACS
- Part of the 2022 Pacific typhoon season

Severe Tropical Storm Ma-on, (Note: The name Ma-on (Cantonese: 馬鞍, [maː˨˧ ɔːn˥]) was contributed by Hong Kong and refers to Ma On Shan in Cantonese.) known in the Philippines as Severe Tropical Storm Florita, was a destructive tropical cyclone that impacted the Philippines in late August 2022. The ninth named storm of the 2022 Pacific typhoon season, Ma-on originated as a disturbance over the Pacific Ocean on August 18, and was upgraded to a tropical depression the next day. The depression strengthened into a tropical storm named Ma-on, and became a severe tropical storm late on August 23 before making landfall in the Philippines. It later made landfall in China and Vietnam on August 25. Ma-on weakened back to a tropical depression before dissipating the next day due to unfavorable conditions.

The storm caused moderate damage in the Philippines, China and Vietnam.

== Meteorological history ==
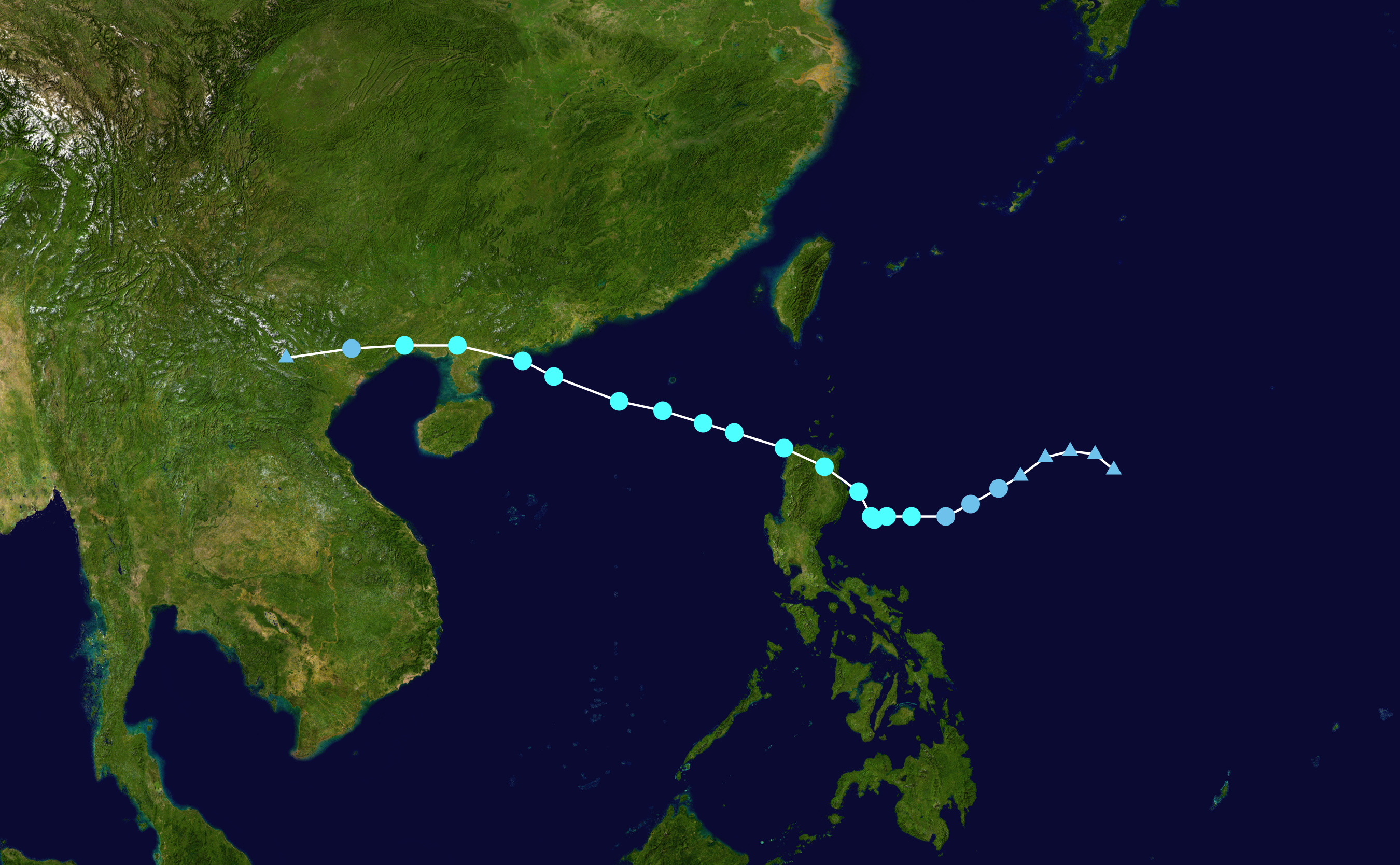
Map plotting the storm's track and intensity, according to the Saffir–Simpson scale (Note: The position of Ma-on's Category 1 peak is not depicted in this graphic as it is an asynoptic point (i.e. not at the 3-hour intervals of all other points) occurring at 11:00 UTC August 23.) Map key Saffir–Simpson scale Tropical depression (≤38 mph, ≤62 km/h) Tropical storm (39–73 mph, 63–118 km/h) Category 1 (74–95 mph, 119–153 km/h) Category 2 (96–110 mph, 154–177 km/h) Category 3 (111–129 mph, 178–208 km/h) Category 4 (130–156 mph, 209–251 km/h) Category 5 (≥157 mph, ≥252 km/h) Unknown Storm type Tropical cyclone Subtropical cyclone Extratropical cyclone, remnant low, tropical disturbance, or monsoon depression

Ma-on originated from a disturbance first noted by the Joint Typhoon Warning Center (JTWC) on August 18, while it was located about 910 km (570 mi) southeast of Taipei, Taiwan. Its deep convection was associated with a strong low-level circulation and persisted, supported by favorable environmental conditions for further development, including warm sea surface temperatures of around 29–30 °C (84–86 °F). On August 19, the Japan Meteorological Agency (JMA) began tracking the system while it was in the Philippine Sea. Moving westward, the system strengthened into a tropical depression on August 20. The following day, the Philippine Atmospheric, Geophysical and Astronomical Services Administration (PAGASA) began tracking the system as it entered the Philippine Area of Responsibility (PAR) and assigned it the local name Florita.

On the same day, the JTWC issued a Tropical Cyclone Formation Alert (TCFA) for the system, and shortly afterward designated it as Tropical Depresion 10W. Satellite imagery showed formative bands wrapping into a low-level circulation center (LLCC). On August 22, the JMA upgraded the system to a tropical storm, naming it Ma-on. Later on, the JTWC and PAGASA also classified the system as a tropical storm. Ma-on began to moved slowly, under the influence of a subtropical ridge off the coast of Luzon. At 18:00 UTC, the JMA upgraded Ma-on to severe tropical storm status. The PAGASA reported that the system intensified into a severe tropical storm on August 23.

At that time, multispectral animated satellite imagery revealed a symmetrical central convection. Ma-on made landfall over Maconacon in the province of Isabela around 10:30 (PHT) (02:30 UTC). The system continued consolidating which allowed it to organized a small microwave eye. Traversing the Luzon Islands before it emerged over the coastal of Ilocos Norte. Ma-on exited the Philippine Area of Responsibility at 05:00 PHT August 24 (21:00 UTC August 23). Upper-Level near the storm's center struggled to organize due to moderate to strong east-northeasterly shear. An Advanced Scatterometer (ASCAT) pass indicated that the storm was along the southern of the system. Ma-on moved west-northwest and subsequently made second landfall just southwest of Yangjiang, China on August 25. Shortly after the landfall, the JTWC discontinued warnings on the system. Ma-on later become unfavorable of its intensity. As a result, the JMA downgraded the system to a tropical storm at 06:00 UTC that day. Ma-on moved west to the Gulf of Tonkin, and made third and final landfall in Móng Cái City, Quảng Ninh Province in Vietnam on 13:00 UTC. After that, JMA declared that Ma-on weakened to a tropical depression, until it was last noted in Northern Vietnam on August 26.

== Preparations and impact ==
=== Philippines ===
==== Highest Tropical Cyclone Wind Signal ====
Highest Tropical Cyclone Wind Signal issued by PAGASA for Ma-on (Florita) in each province. The white line represents the best track.

Ahead of the storm's arrival, PAGASA placed the provinces of Aurora, Isabela and Cagayan under Tropical Cyclone Wind Signal (TCWS) #1 on August 21, 2022. During the next day, PAGASA raised TCWS #2 before TCWS #3 was ultimately issued and extended to include other parts of Luzon on August 23. President Bongbong Marcos suspended classes and government work in some areas in Luzon on August 23 and 24 just one day after the opening of full face-to-face classes, two years since the COVID-19 pandemic in the Philippines prompted schools to shift to distance or online learning.

The Department of Social Welfare and Development (DSWD) said that 16,654 food packs had been prepared. In Isabela, heavy rains brought by the storm caused four overflow bridges to be impassable. In Cagayan, 10,608 hectares of rice and corn farms were destroyed. In Pampanga, 39 barangays were flooded. In Cordillera, 1,882 search and rescue cop teams were placed on standby.

Ma-on about to make landfall over Maconacon, Isabela on August 23.

Power outages were reported in Northern Luzon. Flights from Manila to Bicol were cancelled due to inclement weather. The Philippine Army conducted disaster response operations. The Philippine Coast Guard (PCG) deployed 11 aluminum boats in Marikina City. According to the BJMP, 740 inmates were evacuated. The Metropolitan Manila Development Authority temporarily suspended their number coding scheme.

The NDRRMC reported 17,510 affected people, 4,330 were displaced. At least 4 people were dead, and another 4 were injured. Infrastructure damage was estimated to be ₱571 million (US$10.4 million), while agricultural damage was estimated to be ₱1.86 billion (US$33.6 million).

=== Vietnam ===
In Vietnam, Ma-on uprooted and flooded a large amount of trees. Over 135,000 people were evacuated as the storm approached Vietnam. Ma-on brought heavy rains; from 76.8 mm (3.02 inches) in Đông Triều to 299.4 mm (11.79 inches) in Cẩm Phả, Quảng Ninh. In total, 321 households were flooded, with 38 deeply flooded in Uông Bí. A total of three fatalities were reported as a result of the storm.

Economic damages in Tiên Yên District totaled approximately 28 billion VND (US$1.18 million), while damages in Uông Bí amounted to 11.7 billion VND (US$494,000). In Lạng Sơn, total damages reached 10 billion VND (US$422,000), and in Bắc Kạn, damages were estimated at 4.25 billion VND (US$180,000).

=== Elsewhere ===
In Laos, flash floods were exacerbated by Ma-on. Villages along the Nam Ko river have been damaged. Thousands of people are reportedly affected. In China, total damage by Ma-on was estimated at 150 million yuan (US$20.8 million).

== Retirement ==
After the season, the Typhoon Committee announced that the name Ma-on, along with five others, will be removed from the naming lists. In the spring of 2024, the name was replaced with Tsing-ma for future seasons, which refers to the Tsing Ma Bridge in Hong Kong that connects to Hong Kong International Airport.

After the season, PAGASA announced that the name Florita would be removed from their naming lists after the typhoon caused ₱1 billion in damage in the country. On May 5, 2023, the PAGASA chose the name Francisco as its replacement for the 2026 season.

== See also ==
- Weather of 2022
- Tropical cyclones in 2022
- Typhoon Krovanh (2003) – a relatively strong typhoon which took a similar track.
- Typhoon Nuri (2008) – a moderately strong typhoon which had its near-identical path.
- Typhoon Hagupit (2008) – a much stronger typhoon that had a comparable path to Ma-on.
- Typhoon Nesat (2011) – a much stronger typhoon which took a similar track.
- Typhoon Kai-tak (2012) – a weak typhoon which had its track nearly repeated by Ma-on.
- Typhoon Krosa (2013) – a moderate typhoon that also had a nearly repeated track by Ma-on.
- Typhoon Kalmaegi (2014) – a minimal typhoon that had an identical path and affected the same areas.
- Typhoon Haima (2016) – an intense typhoon which also had a near-identical path.
- Typhoon Mangkhut (2018) – a powerful and destructive typhoon which caused widespread damages in the same areas.
- Typhoon Yagi (2024) – another violent typhoon that caused destruction in the same general areas.
