= Typhoon Guchol (2012) =

Pacific typhoon in 2012

Typhoon Guchol (Butchoy)
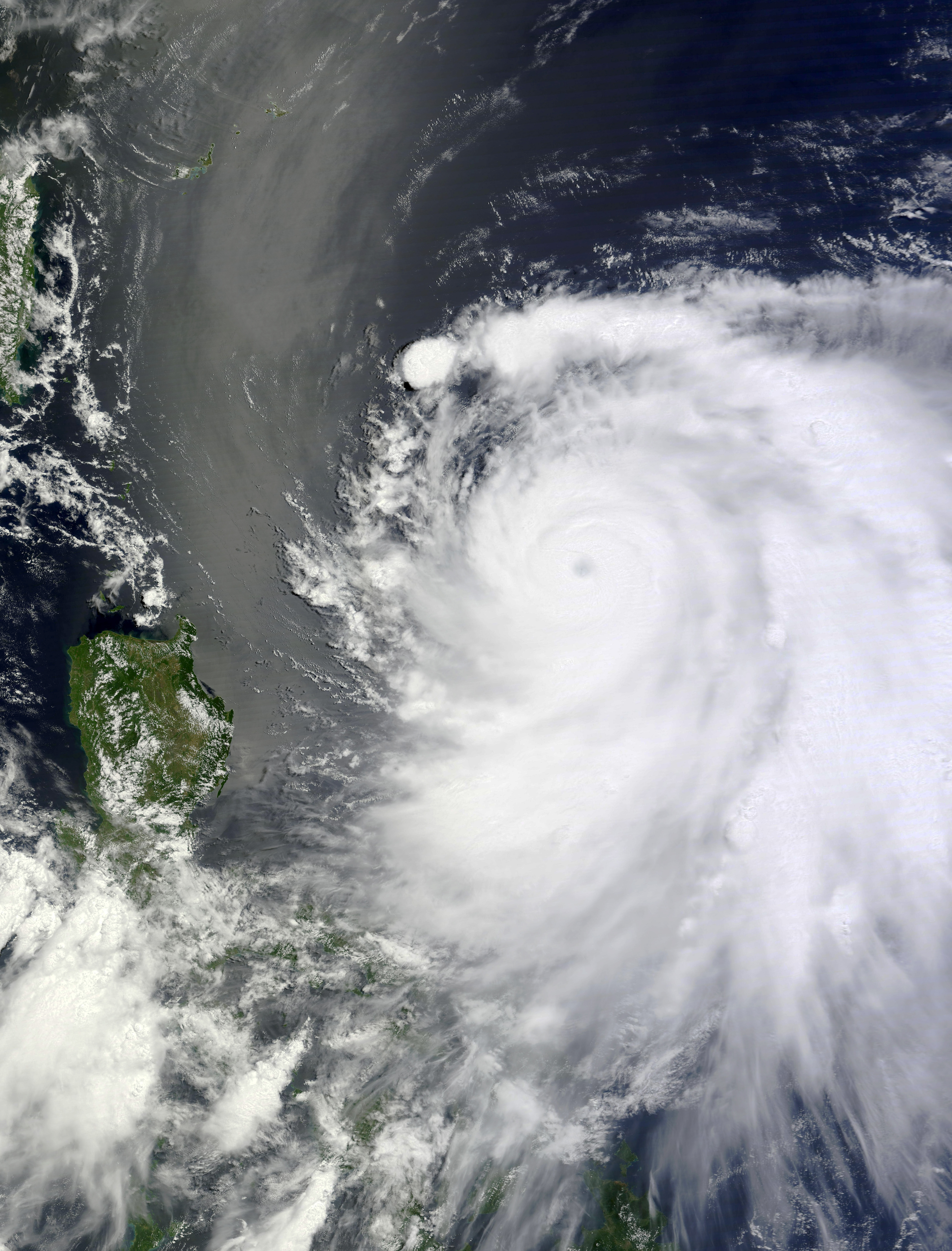
- Typhoon Guchol at peak intensity on June 17

Meteorological history
- Formed: June 10, 2012
- Extratropical: June 20, 2012
- Dissipated: June 22, 2012

Very strong typhoon
- 10-minute sustained (JMA)
- Highest winds: 185 km/h (115 mph)
- Lowest pressure: 930 hPa (mbar); 27.46 inHg

Category 4-equivalent super typhoon
- 1-minute sustained (SSHWS/JTWC)
- Highest winds: 240 km/h (150 mph)
- Lowest pressure: 926 hPa (mbar); 27.34 inHg

Overall effects
- Fatalities: 2 direct
- Damage: $100 million (2012 USD)
- Areas affected: Philippines, Japan
- IBTrACS
- Part of the 2012 Pacific typhoon season

Typhoon Guchol, (Note: The name Guchol (Yapese: guchoel, [ɣʊʈ͡ʂœːl]) was contributed by the Federated States of Micronesia and means turmeric (Curcuma longa) in Yapese.) known in the Philippines as Typhoon Butchoy, was a powerful tropical cyclone which became the first typhoon to make landfall in Japan on June since Dianmu in 2004. Guchol was also the most recent typhoon of Category 3-equivalent or higher strength to occur in the month of June until Mekkhala in 2026. The storm formed as tropical disturbance south-southeast of Pohnpei on June 7, and was upgraded to a tropical depression on June 10. The system later intensified in favorable conditions, and reached typhoon intensity on June 15. It reached peak intensity late on June 17, before making landfall over Japan as a typhoon on June 19. The system became extratropical shortly after traversing Japan and was last noted by the Japan Meteorological Agency on June 22.

Authorities issued evacuation orders for more than 150,000 people in central, eastern and northeastern Japan, Kyodo News said, with warnings of dangerous landslides from the heavy rain. Heavy rains and strong winds affected much of Honshu as the storm moved across the region. One person was killed and fifty-two others were injured across the country.

== Meteorological history ==
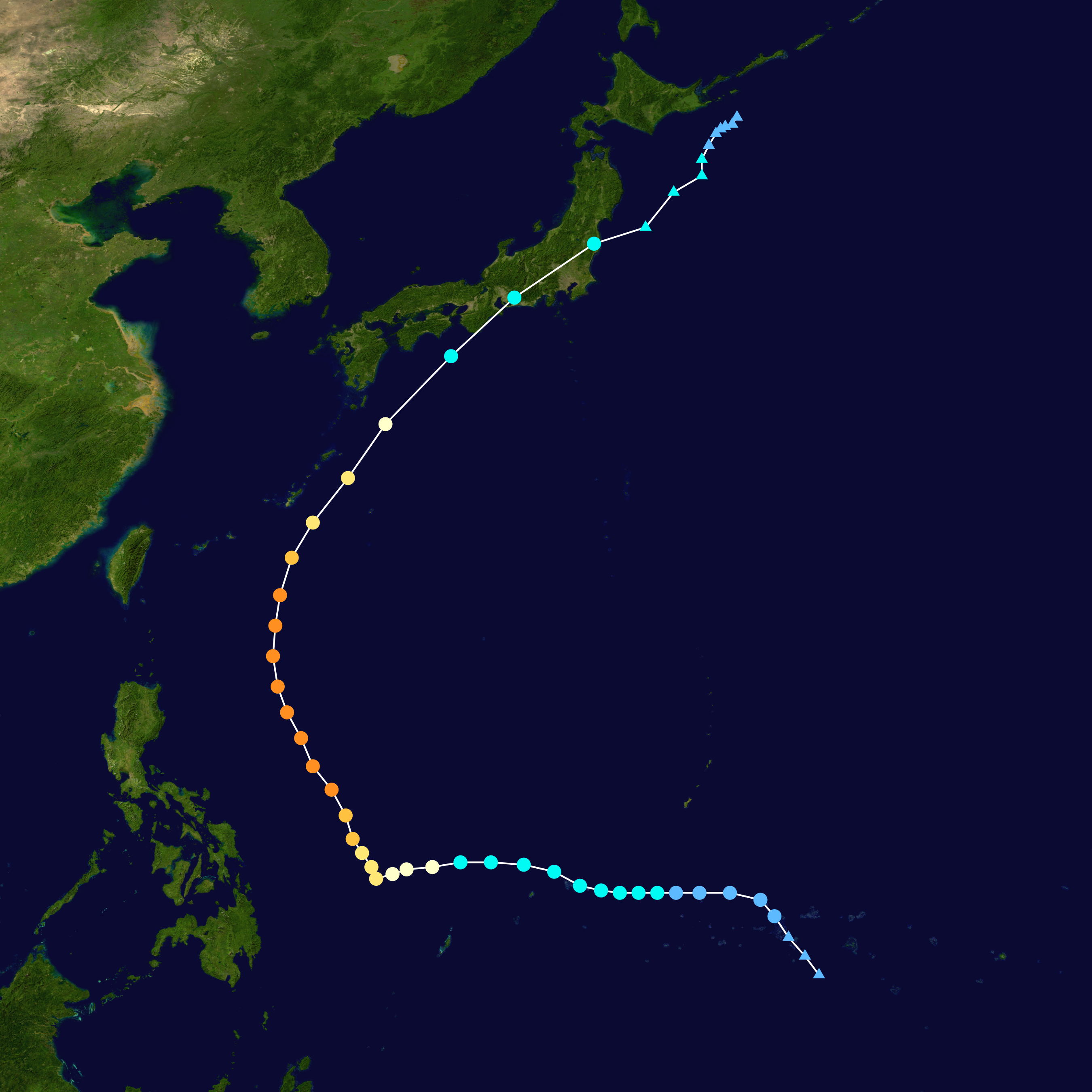
Map plotting the storm's track and intensity, according to the Saffir–Simpson scale Map key Saffir–Simpson scale Tropical depression (≤38 mph, ≤62 km/h) Tropical storm (39–73 mph, 63–118 km/h) Category 1 (74–95 mph, 119–153 km/h) Category 2 (96–110 mph, 154–177 km/h) Category 3 (111–129 mph, 178–208 km/h) Category 4 (130–156 mph, 209–251 km/h) Category 5 (≥157 mph, ≥252 km/h) Unknown Storm type Tropical cyclone Subtropical cyclone Extratropical cyclone, remnant low, tropical disturbance, or monsoon depression

In early June, a tropical disturbance, embedded within the end of a monsoon trough, formed to the southeast of Guam. The Joint Typhoon Warning Center (JTWC) then started to monitor the system late on June 7, as it had scattered deep convection over its poorly defined low-level circulation center (LLCC), but was under an environment of 28–30 °C (82–86 °F) sea surface temperatures, low vertical wind shear, good divergence and enhanced poleward outflow. As the system moved westward, it significantly organized, prompting the JTWC to issue a Tropical Cyclone Formation Alert (TCFA) by the next day. However, the JTWC canceled the TCFA late on June 9, as its center became elongated. The system then started to reorganize by the next day, and by June 11, the Japan Meteorological Agency (JMA) upgraded the system into a tropical depression. The JTWC later followed suit, as formative bands wrapped around its center. As it continued westward, the system struggled to organize, with its center becoming ill-defined.

By 03:00 UTC the next day, the JTWC reported that the tropical depression had intensified into a tropical storm, as improved convective banding began wrapping into its center. The JMA upgraded the storm three hours later, naming it as Guchol. Over the next few days, Guchol slowly intensified, as convection continued to wrap into the system. By 00:00 UTC on June 14, the JMA upgraded Guchol to a severe tropical storm. It subsequently entered the Philippine Area of Responsibility, with the PAGASA naming it locally as Butchoy. At 15:00 UTC, the JTWC upgraded the system to a Category 1-equivalent typhoon on the Saffir-Simpson scale, as it built a central dense overcast. By the next day, it further strengthened to a Category 2-equivalent typhoon, as an outflow channel became apparent while it took a north-northwestward turn around the western periphery of the subtropical ridge. At 21:00 UTC that same day, the JTWC upgraded Guchol to a Category 3-equivalent typhoon. The JMA upgraded Guchol to a typhoon three hours later, on June 16. Nine hours later, Guchol strengthened into a Category 4-equivalent typhoon, as a 18 nmi (33 km) symmetric eye formed. Guchol ultimately reached its peak intensity at 18:00 UTC that same day, with 10-minute sustained winds of 100 knots (185 km/h; 115 mph) and a central pressure of 930 hectopascals (27 inHg), according to the JMA. The JTWC estimated Guchol to have 1-minute sustained winds of 130 knots (240 km/h; 150 mph), although it noted that the system's eye had become less symmetric.

By the next day, Guchol started its eyewall replacement cycle, as double eyewalls were seen in microwave imageries. The system then started to weaken from its peak intensity at 12:00 UTC that day, as it was completing the replacement cycle while moving into slightly cooler sea surface temperatures. At 09:00 UTC on June 18, Guchol weakened into a category 3-equivalent typhoon, as its eyewall deteriorated while turning to the north-northeast, along with increasing wind shear. It then exited the Philippine Area of Responsibility three hours later, with the PAGASA issuing its final advisory on the system. The JTWC further downgraded Guchol to a category 2-equivalent typhoon as its eye became cloud-filled. On June 19, Guchol weakened to a category 1-equivalent typhoon, as its convection began to elongate while interacting with the mid-latitude westerlies, before further weakening to a tropical storm as it rapidly approached the Kii Peninsula. At 08:00 UTC, Guchol made its first landfall over southern Wakayama Prefecture, as it began its extratropical transition. Three hours later, it made its second landfall in eastern Aichi Prefecture. Subsequently, the JMA downgraded Guchol to a severe tropical storm, and the JTWC issued their final advisory on Guchol. Traversing the Kanto-Koshin region, the system emerged to the coast of Fukushima Prefecture, with the JMA issuing their final advisory by the next day, as it fully became an extratropical cyclone. The remnants of the system was last noted near Hokkaido two days later.

== Preparations and impacts ==
=== Philippines ===
Although Typhoon Guchol (locally known as Butchoy) remained away from the Philippines, its slow movement enhanced the southwest monsoon over the country and resulted in widespread heavy rain. The effects of these rains were relatively limited though, with isolated flooding over parts of Marikina, Navotas, Malabon, Marilao, and Guagua, with no major damage reported. However, one person drowned in Rizal.

=== Japan ===
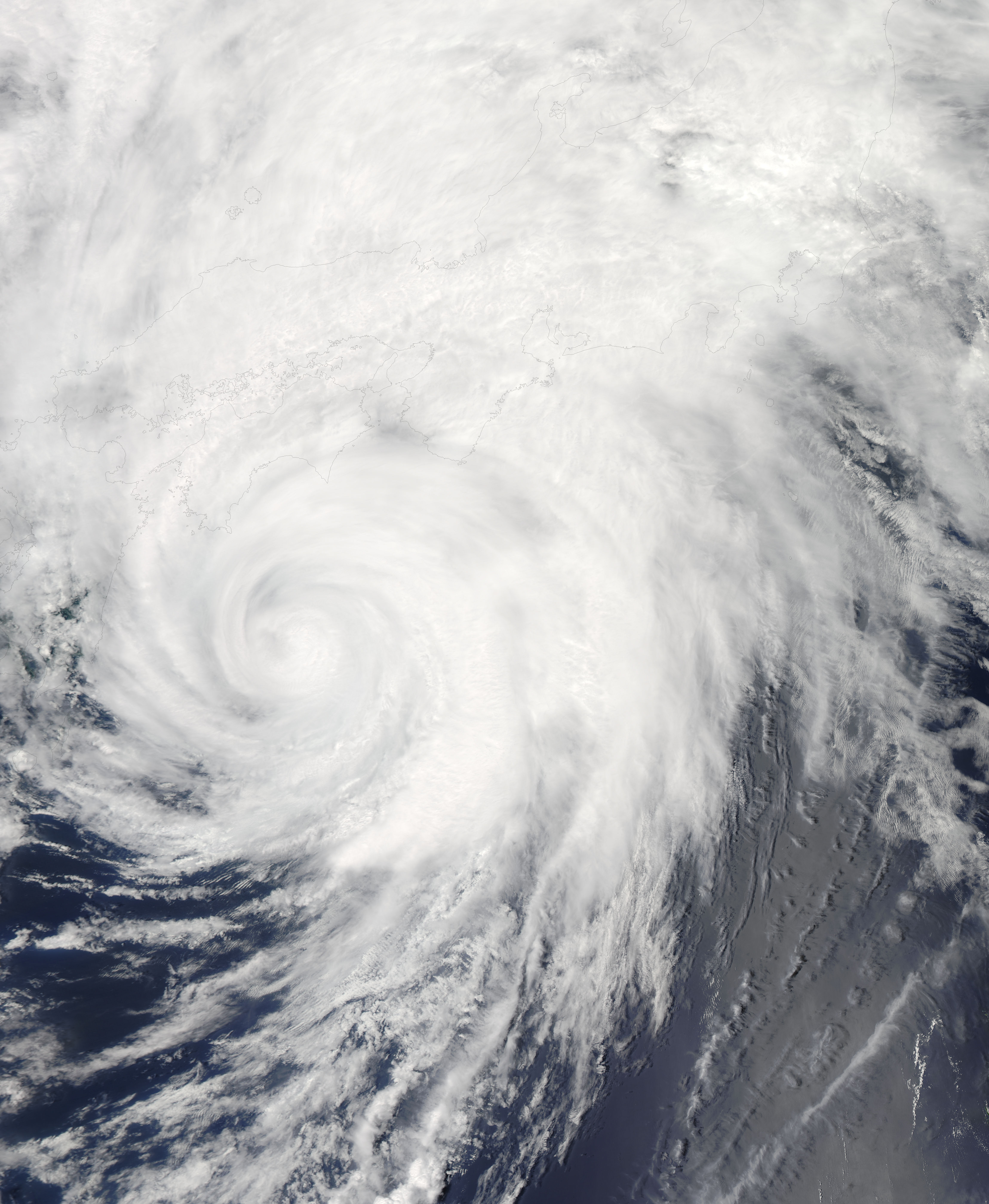
Typhoon Guchol approaching Japan on June 19

Authorities issued evacuation orders for more than 150,000 people in central, eastern and northeastern Japan, with warnings of dangerous landslides from the heavy rain. 452 domestic and international flights were cancelled, affecting 35,000 passengers, while travel on regional and high-speed trains had been hit with delays and cancellations, with some roads also been closed.

As the typhoon moved through Japan, heavy rainfall fell throughout the Tokai and Kanto-Koshin regions, with 24-hour rainfall records in June being broken in Mie Prefecture, Shizuoka Prefecture and Ibaraki Prefecture. Total accumulated rainfall totals of 405.5 mm (15.96 in) were reported at Miyagawa in Ōdai, and 362.5 mm (14.27 in) at Mount Amagi in Izu, Shizuoka. Hourly rainfall totals in Lake Tanzawa set a new record of 81 mm/h (3.2 in/h) since records began. Wind speeds peaked at 29.3 m/s (105 km/h; 66 mph) at Miyake, Tokyo, and 27.1 m/s (98 km/h; 61 mph) in Omaezaki, Shizuoka. The latter location also recorded wind gusts of 41.4 m/s (149 km/h; 93 mph), and 39.1 m/s (141 km/h; 87 mph) was reported in Cape Irōzaki. The weather station in Yokohama, Kanagawa Prefecture recorded gusts of 35.6 m/s (128 km/h; 80 mph), setting a new June record. A 53-year old man died in Numazu, Shizuoka after being caught in a building collapse. 79 people were injured, five of which had serious injuries, along with 402 homes affected. Landslides were reported in various prefectures. Total economic losses were estimated in excess of ¥8 billion (US$100 million).

== See also ==
- Typhoon Man-yi (2013)
- Tropical Storm Talas (2011)
- Typhoon Mekkhala (2026)
