= Typhoon Hagupit (2008) =

Pacific typhoon in 2008

Typhoon Hagupit (Nina)
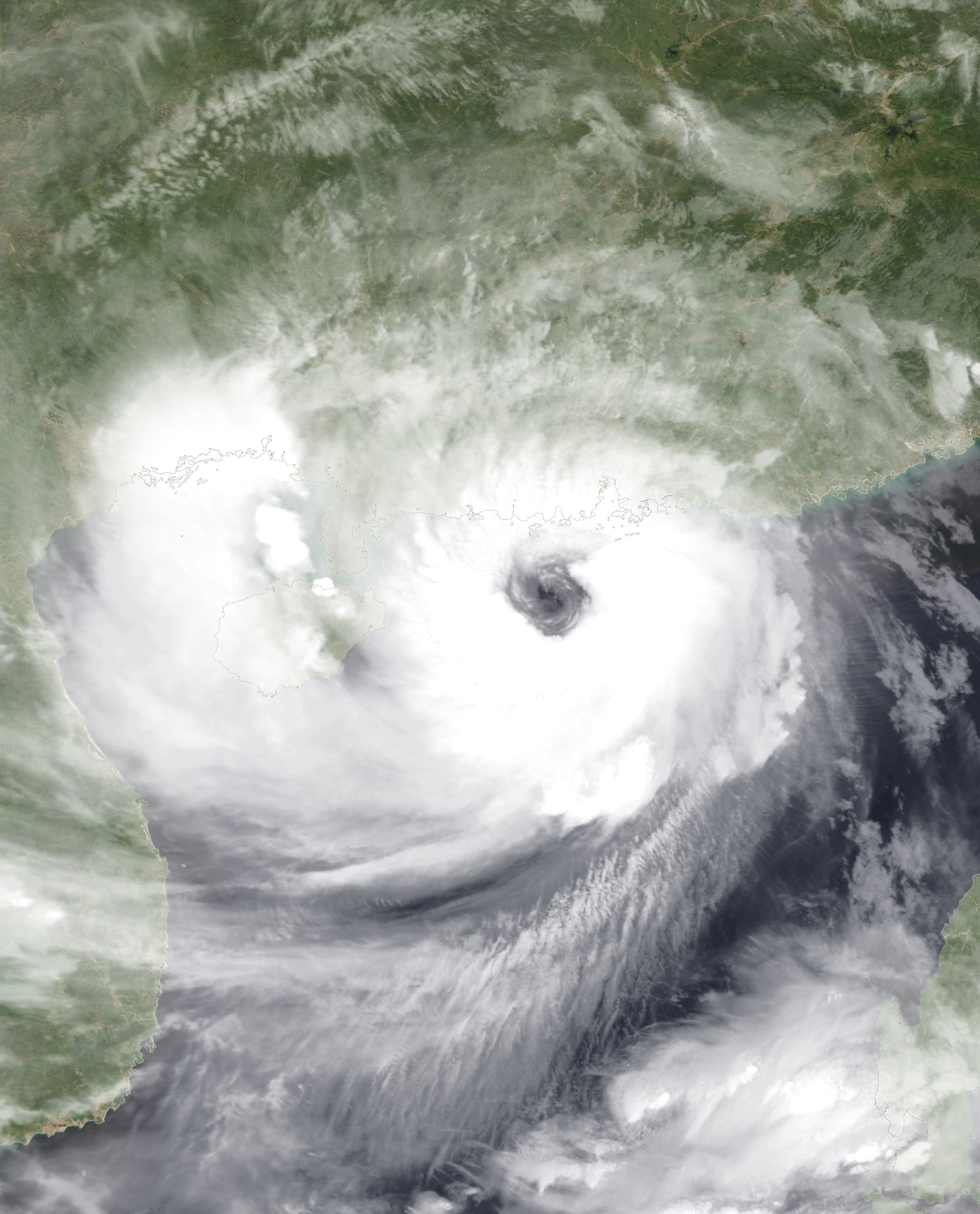
- Hagupit near peak intensity and approaching Guangdong on September 23

Meteorological history
- Formed: September 18, 2008
- Dissipated: September 25, 2008

Very strong typhoon
- 10-minute sustained (JMA)
- Highest winds: 165 km/h (105 mph)
- Lowest pressure: 935 hPa (mbar); 27.61 inHg

Category 4-equivalent typhoon
- 1-minute sustained (SSHWS/JTWC)
- Highest winds: 230 km/h (145 mph)
- Lowest pressure: 929 hPa (mbar); 27.43 inHg

Overall effects
- Fatalities: 102 total
- Damage: $1 billion (2008 USD)
- Areas affected: Philippines, Taiwan, Hong Kong, China, Vietnam
- IBTrACS
- Part of the 2008 Pacific typhoon season

Typhoon Hagupit, (Note: The name Hagupit (Tagalog: hagupit, [hɐ.ɣʊ.ˈpɪt̚]) was contributed by the Philippines and means "lashing, whipping" in Tagalog.) known in the Philippines as Typhoon Nina, was a powerful tropical cyclone that caused widespread destruction along its path in mid September 2008. The 21st depression, 14 tropical storm and 10th typhoon of the 2008 Pacific typhoon season, Hagupit developed from a tropical wave located a couple hundred miles east of the Marshall Islands on September 14. Moving generally north-west westwards towards the Philippines, the depression gradually intensified into a tropical storm the following day, and then into became a typhoon on September 22 off the northern coast of Luzon. Located within an environment conducive for strengthening, Hagupit rapidly strengthened to attain 10-min sustained winds of 165 kilometres per hour (103 mph; 89 kn) and 1-min sustained winds of 230 kilometres per hour (140 mph; 120 kn). After making landfall in Guangdong province in China at peak intensity on September 23, Hagupit rapidly weakened over rugged terrain and dissipated on the 25th.

Hagupit was responsible for 16 deaths, with 7 others missing, and 352.5 million pesos (US$7.49 million) in damage across the Philippines. A total of 128,507 people were affected across 13 provinces. In Hong Kong, 61 flights at Hong Kong International Airport were cancelled, 87 were delayed, and more were delayed because of the typhoon. Schools and courts in the territory were also closed. Tai O experienced heavy flooding, while the foundations of several houses in Cheung Chau were severely damaged. In Taiwan, at least 1 person was killed and many thousands of people stranded due to Hagupit. Furthermore, several buildings, including a prominent hotel were damaged by the storm. In Guangdong province, 10 were killed, and 2 remain missing after the storm, mostly in Guangdong province. At least 18,500 houses were destroyed and total economic losses reached ¥6.3 billion (US$923.7 million). A total of 17 people were killed, with two others listed as missing. Overall, the storm was responsible for 102 deaths and $1 billion in damage across several countries.

== Meteorological history ==
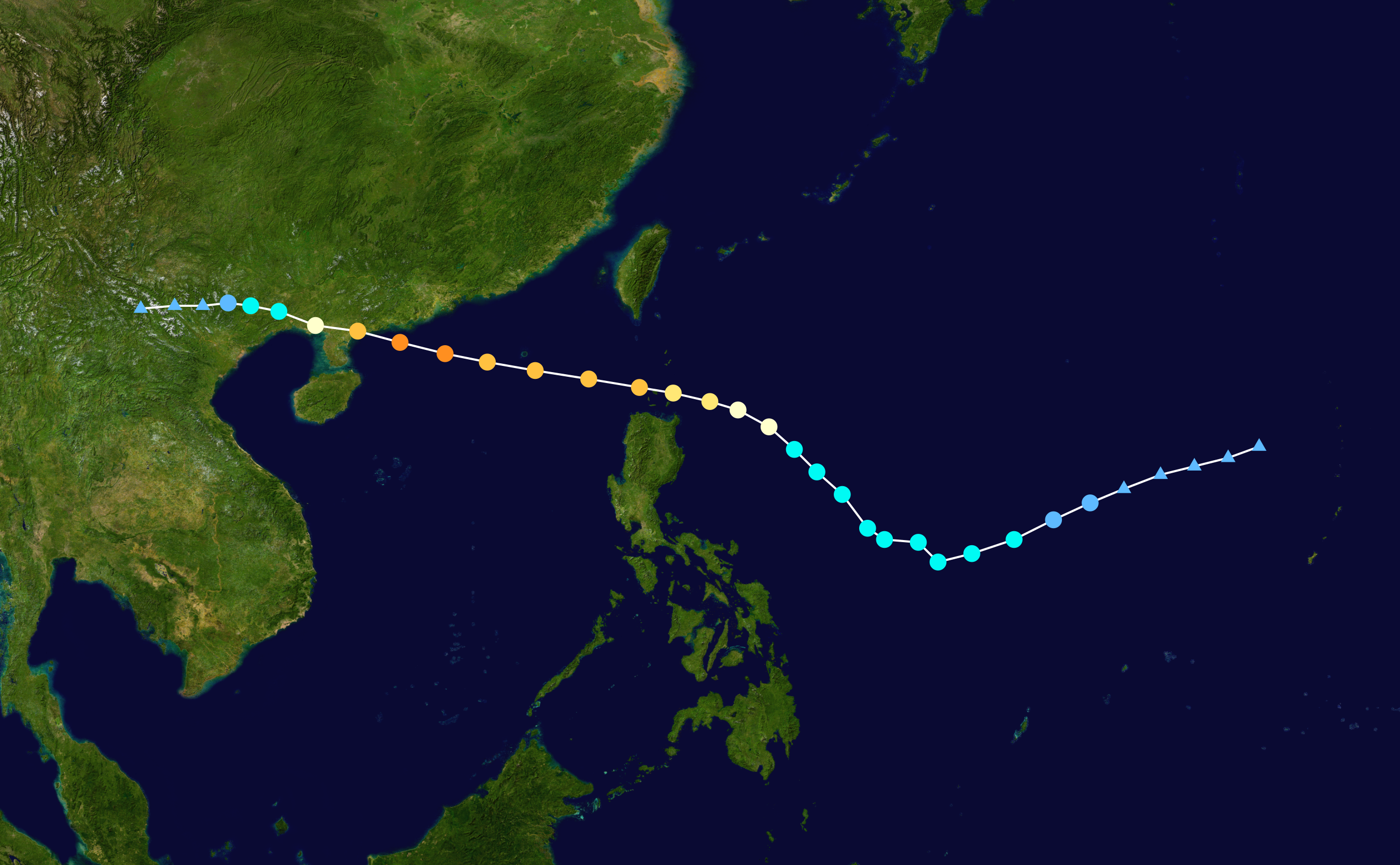
Map plotting the storm's track and intensity, according to the Saffir–Simpson scale Map key Saffir–Simpson scale Tropical depression (≤38 mph, ≤62 km/h) Tropical storm (39–73 mph, 63–118 km/h) Category 1 (74–95 mph, 119–153 km/h) Category 2 (96–110 mph, 154–177 km/h) Category 3 (111–129 mph, 178–208 km/h) Category 4 (130–156 mph, 209–251 km/h) Category 5 (≥157 mph, ≥252 km/h) Unknown Storm type Tropical cyclone Subtropical cyclone Extratropical cyclone, remnant low, tropical disturbance, or monsoon depression

On September 14, the Japan Meteorological Agency (JMA) began to track a tropical disturbance to the northeast of Guam. Over the next three days it gradually developed while moving southwestwards towards the Philippines. The JMA designated the disturbance as a tropical depression on September 17; later that day, the Joint Typhoon Warning Center (JTWC) issued a Tropical Cyclone Formation Alert on the depression. On the next day the JTWC designated the system as Tropical Depression 18W. At this point, the depression turned to the northwest and continued to gradually intensify. Early on September 19, the JMA began to issue full advisories on the depression; that same day, the depression moved into PAGASA's area of responsibility and was assigned the local name Nina. Later that day both the JMA & the JTWC upgraded the depression to a tropical storm, with the JMA assigning the international name of Hagupit and the international number of 0814.

Throughout the next day, Hagupit continued to organize; as a result, the JMA reported that Hagupit had intensified into a severe tropical storm. Simultaneously, the PAGASA reported that Hagupit had intensified into a typhoon; however, both the JMA and the JTWC did not upgrade Hagupit to a typhoon until early the next afternoon. Rapid intensification ensued as the storm tuned west and paralleled the northern coast of Luzon, and on September 22, the JTWC upgraded the storm a Category 2 typhoon. Continuing to intensify while moving through the Luzon Strait, Hagupit was upgraded later that day by the JTWC to Category 3-equivalent strength. Early the next day PAGASA issued its final advisory on Hagupit after it moved out of PAR into the South China Sea. Later that day the JTWC upgraded Hagupit to a Category 4 typhoon as Hagupit approached southern China. The same day, Hagupit struck Guangdong Province in southeastern China at peak intensity with estimated 10-minute winds of 165 km/h (105 mph) and 1-minute winds of 230 km/h (145 mph), becoming the first known typhoon to hit Guangdong province as a category 4-equivalent typhoon. Shortly after Hagupit's landfall, the JTWC issued its final warning on the typhoon. Continuing to move inland, Hagupit rapidly weakened, dropping below typhoon strength within 12 hours of landfall. After the storm weakened below tropical storm strength on September 25, the JMA stopped issuing advisories on Hagupit; the remnant low of the storm dissipated over northern Vietnam a few hours later.

== Preparations ==
=== Philippines ===
On September 20, the PAGASA issued Public Storm Signal No.1 for the Catanduanes in Luzon. Later that day PAGASA hoisted Signal No.2 for the Catanduanes and hoisted added Signal No.1 over other provinces of the Philippines. On September 21 as Hagupit moved towards the north-east PAGASA revised their warnings by lowering the signals for Samar. Later that day PAGASA placed further provinces under storm signal No. 2 and issued Storm Signal No. 3 over various provinces in Luzon including the Calayan Group of Islands, Cagayan & Babuyan. Late the next day the Signal No. 3's were downgraded to Signal No. 2 as Hagupit moved away from the Philippines. PAGASA then removed Signal No 2 within their next advisory, PAGASA then issued their final advisory as Hagupit moved out of PAGASA's Area of Responsibility.

=== Taiwan ===
On September 21, Taiwan's Central Weather Bureau issued a Sea warning for ships sailing in the seas to the south and southeast of the country. Early the next day the CWB issued land warnings for southern Taiwan as Hagupit moved past the nation. Also, the President cancelled a naval marine landing drill due to Hagupit.

=== Mainland China ===
On September 22, Chinese officials in Fujian Province requested the return of all fishing vessels in the Taiwan Strait. In Shenzhen airport, 33 domestic flights were cancelled due to the approach of Hagupit. Officials in Yangjiang City evacuated 17,324 people from dangerous areas and checked over all the dams and reservoirs. More than 100,000 people were evacuated to safer locations from coastal regions in southern China by September 23.

=== Hong Kong ===
On 22 September 2008, the Hong Kong Observatory (HKO) issued the Standby Signal 1 for Hong Kong. The HKO kept this signal in force for 18 hours before issuing the Strong Wind Signal No.3 the next day. Later on 23 September 2008, as Hagupit moved closer to Guangdong, the HKO announced at 1600 (HKT) that the Gale or Storm Signal 8 will be issued by 1800 (HKT). The HKO then issued the Gale or Storm Signal 8 Northeast at 1800 (HKT). It was replaced by the Gale or Storm Signal 8 Southeast soon after midnight that evening due to change in wind direction. Six hours later at 0630 (HKT), the HKO lowered the warning to the Strong Wind Signal 3. Because of the heavy rain brought by Hagupit, the HKO issued the Amber rainstorm warning at 1100 (HKT). All Hong Kong tropical cyclone warning signals was cancelled at around 1300 (HKT) Later that day, the HKO removed the Amber rainstorm warning at 1620 (HKT).

== Impact ==
=== Philippines ===
Impact by country
Country	Fatalities	Damage
China	19	$924 million
Philippines	23	$7.49 million
Taiwan	1	—N/a
Thailand	18	—N/a
Vietnam	41	$72.5 million
Total	102	$1 billion
Sources cited in text.

Typhoon Hagupit was responsible for 16 deaths, with 7 others missing, and 352.5 million pesos (US$7.49 million) in damage. A total of 128,507 people were affected across 13 provinces. Thirteen miners were trapped in a flooded tunnel. 4 of the deaths were caused by drowning, 3 by landslides, and the last by electrocution. 5,000 people were also displaced because of the storm. During the storm, ferries and fishing craft in Luzon were recalled to port. All in all, about 10,000 in 47 villages were affected by the storm. The estimated total cost of damages caused by Hagupit in the Philippines is currently put at 29.5 Million Php.

=== Hong Kong ===
In Hong Kong, 61 flights at Hong Kong International Airport were cancelled, 87 were delayed, and more were delayed because of the typhoon. Schools and courts in the territory were also closed. Tai O experienced heavy flooding, while the foundations of several houses in Cheung Chau were severely damaged. Sewers overflowed with seawater in various parts of the territory. 58 were injured during the storm. Several buildings suffered particularly heavy damage due to the storm's arrival at high tide.

=== Taiwan/ROC ===
In Taiwan, at least 1 person was killed and many thousands of people stranded as a result of the depredations of Typhoon Hagupit. Furthermore, several buildings, including a prominent hotel were damaged by the storm.

=== People's Republic of China ===
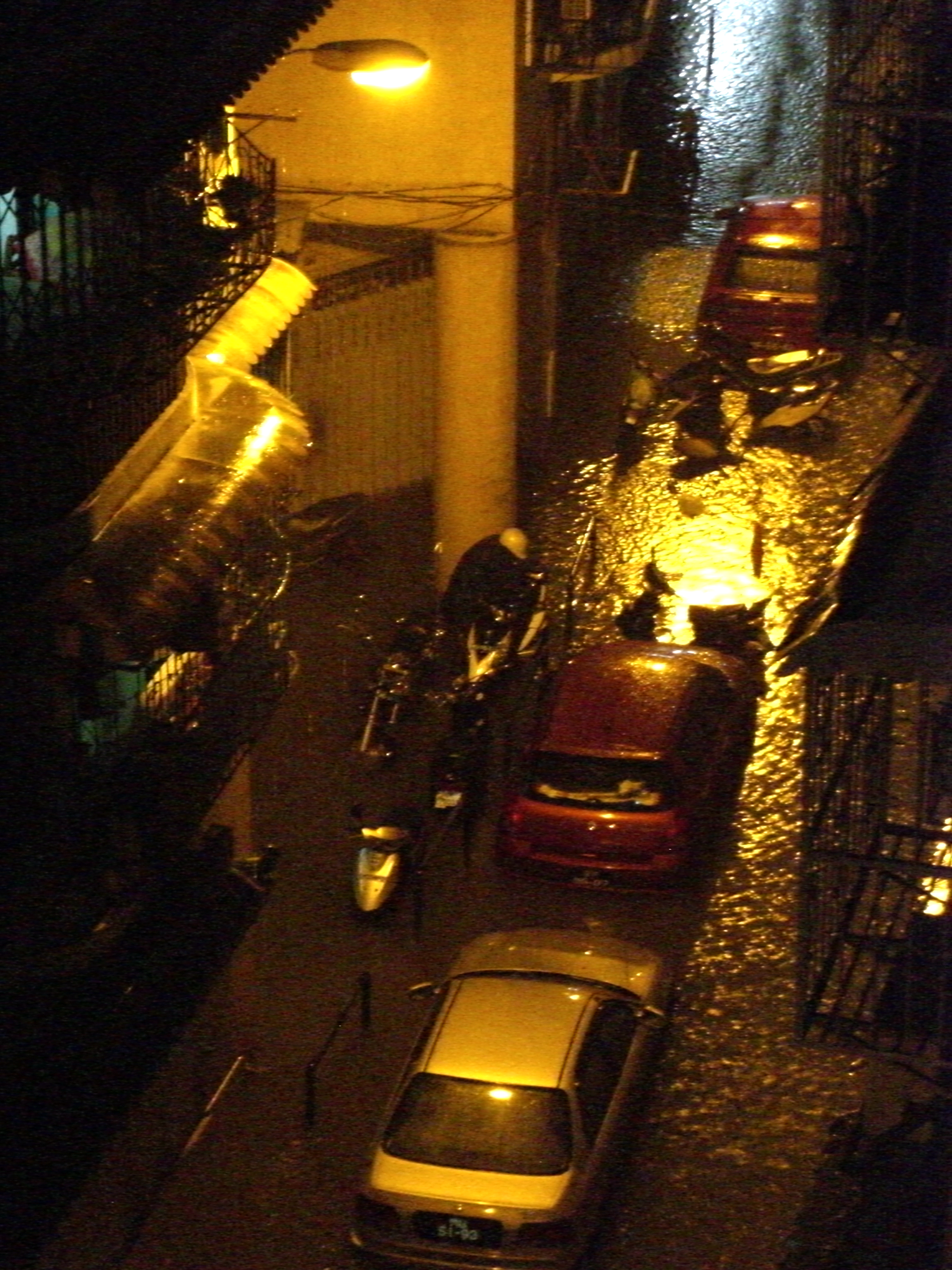
Flooding in Macau during Hagupit.

Typhoon Hagupit made landfall near Maoming in Guangdong Province of the People's Republic of China at 6:45 a.m. local time on September 24. 10 were killed, and 2 remain missing after the storm, mostly in Guangdong province. At least 18,500 houses were destroyed and total economic losses reached ¥6.3 billion (US$923.7 million). More than 28 thousand people were evacuated because of the storm, 17,324 people from Yangjiang, and about 11,000 from Xuwen County. Trees and billboards near Maoming sustained damage, and 51,000 ships carrying 200,000 crew were recalled back to port. Schools were also closed in Zhanjiang. A total of 17 people were killed, with two others listed as missing.

=== Vietnam ===
Vietnam began stockpiling food and medicine in preparation for the typhoon. 550 tourist and fishing boats were recalled back to port in Hạ Long Bay, and rescue equipment was positioned in nine northern provinces. The government said that "...there will be very heavy torrential rains, significantly raising the risk of flash floods and land slides in the nine mountainous provinces in the eye of the storm." As of September 29, 2008, the flooding left behind by the typhoon left 41 people dead, and at least 60 injured. Damages exceeded ₫1 trillion (US$72.49 million). 1,300 houses were completely destroyed with about 10,000 more damaged. Though the storm did not directly hit Vietnam, heavy rains caused heavy flooding, especially in the provinces of Sơn La, Lạng Sơn, Bắc Giang and Quảng Ninh. Hoang Thi Luu, a farmer from Tuan Dao, said, "The waters came really quick, coming down the mountains and from the rising rivers and streams. ... No one had enough time to save their property; they just ran for their lives."

== See also ==
- Tropical cyclones in 2008
- Typhoon Vicente (2012)
- Typhoon Krosa (2013)
- Typhoon Rammasun (2014)
- Typhoon Hagupit (2014)
- Typhoon Mangkhut (2018)
- Tropical Storm Kompasu (2021)
- Tropical Storm Ma-on (2022)
- Typhoon Doksuri (2023)
- Typhoon Yagi (2024)
- Typhoon Ragasa (2025)
