= List of storms named Onyok =

The name Onyok has been used for four tropical cyclones in the Philippine Area of Responsibility by PAGASA in the Western Pacific Ocean.

- Typhoon Dujuan (2003) (T0313, 14W, Onyok) – hit near Hong Kong.
- Typhoon Roke (2011) (T1115, 18W, Onyok) – affected Japan
- Tropical Depression 29W (2015) (29W, Onyok) – a weak tropical cyclone that caused only minimal damages in the Philippines
- Typhoon Mitag (2019) (T1819, 19W, Onyok) – a moderately strong typhoon that severely affected Taiwan, East China and South Korea.

Preceded by Nimfa	Pacific typhoon season names Onyok	Succeeded by Perla
