= 2004 Pacific typhoon season =

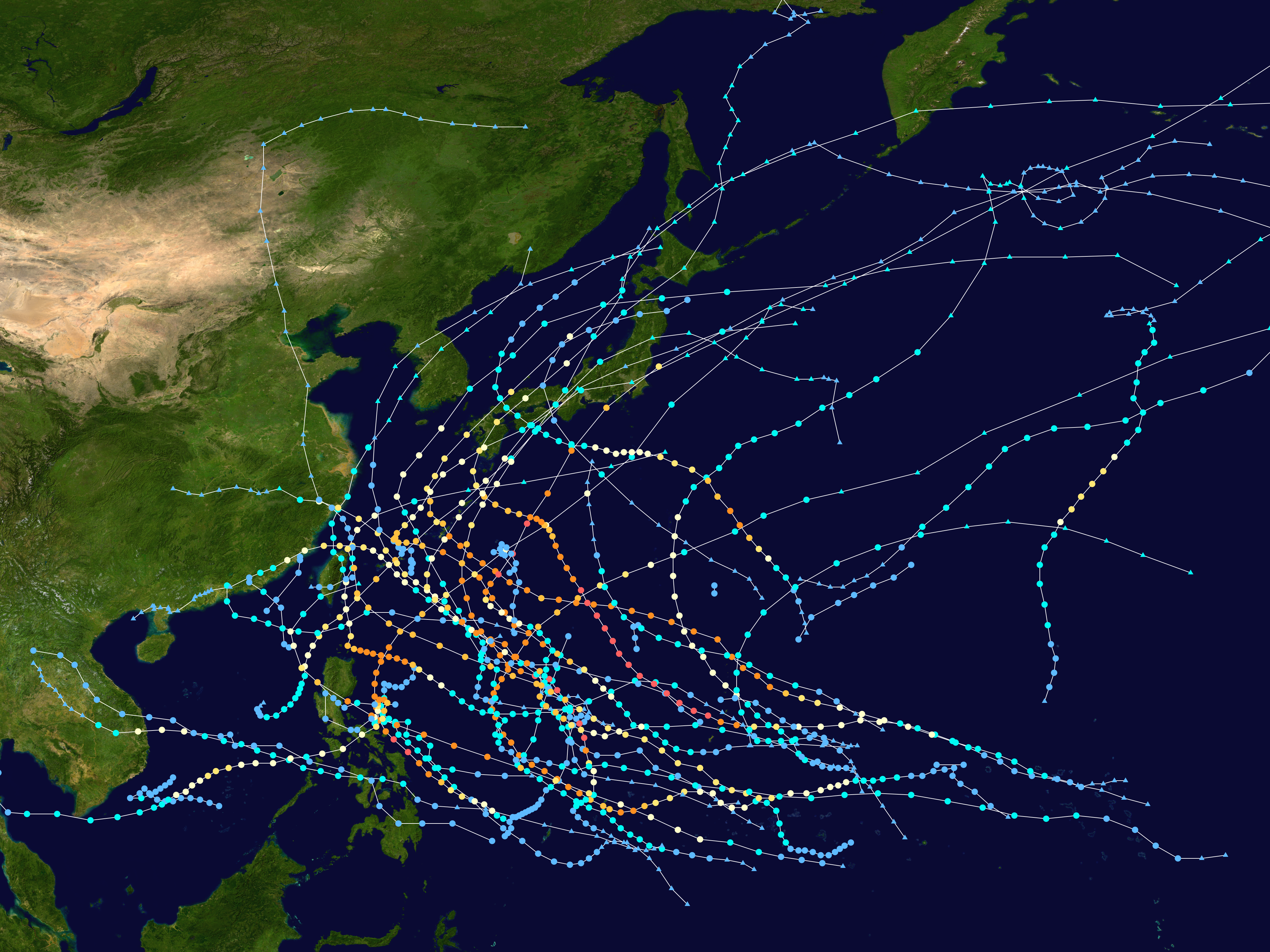
- Season summary map

Seasonal boundaries
- First system formed: February 10, 2004
- Last system dissipated: December 22, 2004

Strongest storm
- Name: Chaba
  - Maximum winds: 205 km/h (125 mph) (10-minute sustained)
  - Lowest pressure: 910 hPa (mbar)

Seasonal statistics
- Total depressions: 45
- Total storms: 29
- Typhoons: 19
- Very strong typhoons: 12
- Violent typhoons: 1
- ACE: 480.6 (second-highest)
- Total fatalities: 2,435 total
- Total damage: ≥ $18.77 billion (2004 USD)

Related articles
- 2004 Atlantic hurricane season; 2004 Pacific hurricane season; 2004 North Indian Ocean cyclone season

The 2004 Pacific typhoon season produced the second-highest accumulated cyclone energy value in the basin, only after 1997. Moreover, it was an extremely active season, featuring twenty-nine named storms, nineteen typhoons, and six super typhoons. The season's high activity was brought on due to the presence of a Modoki El Niño - a rare type of El Niño in which extremely favorable conditions exist in the Western Pacific basin due to the normally warmer-than-average waters shifting further westward. The season's first named storm and also the first typhoon, Sudal, developed on April 4, later was reached typhoon status two days later, and became the first super typhoon of the year three days later. (Note: A super typhoon is an unofficial category used by the Joint Typhoon Warning Center (JTWC) for a typhoon with winds of at least 240 km/h (150 mph).) The season's last named storm, Noru, dissipated on December 22.

The scope of this article is limited to the Pacific Ocean to the north of the equator between 100°E and 180th meridian. Within the northwestern Pacific Ocean, there are two separate agencies that assign names to tropical cyclones, which can often result in a cyclone having two names. The Japan Meteorological Agency (JMA) (Note: The Japan Meteorological Agency is the official Regional Specialized Meteorological Center for the western Pacific Ocean.) names a tropical cyclone should it be judged to have 10-minute sustained wind speeds of at least 65 km/h (40 mph) anywhere in the basin, whilst the Philippine Atmospheric, Geophysical and Astronomical Services Administration (PAGASA) assigns names to tropical cyclones which move into or form as a tropical depression in their area of responsibility located between 135°E and 115°E and between 5°N and 25°N, regardless of whether or not a tropical cyclone has already been given a name by the JMA. Tropical depressions that are monitored by the United States' Joint Typhoon Warning Center (JTWC) (Note: The Joint Typhoon Warning Center is a joint United States Navy – United States Air Force task force that issues tropical cyclone warnings for the western Pacific Ocean and other regions.) are given a number with a "W" suffix.

== Seasonal summary ==
Most intense Pacific typhoon seasons
Rank	Seasons	ACE value
1	1997	570.4
2	2004	480.6
3	1992	470.1
4	2015	462.9
5	1994	454.6
6	1958	445.8
7	1957	440.2
8	1965	436.2
9	1962	423
10	1996	416.5

Costliest known Pacific typhoon seasons
Rank	Total damages	Season
1	$38.54 billion	2019
2	$38.06 billion	2023
3	$30.59 billion	2018
4	$29.62 billion	2024
5	$26.45 billion	2013
6	$21.05 billion	2012
7	$18.77 billion	2004
8	$17.44 billion	1991
9	$17.18 billion	2000
10	$16.96 billion	2016

The activity of the season was extremely high, while the impacts of the typhoons were damaging and deadly, including four consecutive typhoons that struck them in the Philippines. In August, Typhoon Rananim struck Taiwan and China causing widespread damage, killing 169 people and with an estimated $2.44 billion (USD 2004) in damage. Typhoon Aere also caused heavy damage in China after Rananim killed 107 people there with minimal damage. Typhoon Songda was the costliest typhoon of the season to hit Japan, with damage estimated at $9.3 billion (US$2004) (Note: All damage totals are valued as of 2004 and in United States dollars, unless otherwise noted.) and 28 people killed. In October, Typhoon Tokage hit Japan as a tropical storm, causing a total of 95 deaths and damage estimated at $2.3 billion (2004 USD). Tropical Depression Winnie struck the Philippines killing a total of 1,593 people, making Winnie the deadliest storm of the season since Tropical Storm Thelma in 1991. After the month of November, the seasonal activity onwards decreased. The activity during the month included two typhoons. Muifa struck the Philippines after Winnie, killing 68 people and subsequently bringing heavy rains to Thailand killing 40 people. The fourth and last consecutive typhoon to hit the Philippines was Nanmadol which made landfall as a Category 4 typhoon in that country, killing a total of 77 people.

The Accumulated Cyclone Energy (ACE) index of this season amounted to 60% above the normal level for Pacific typhoon seasons, calculated by Colorado State University using data from the Joint Typhoon Warning Center to be 480.6 units. This makes the season the second-most intense Pacific typhoon season in recorded history, only after 1997. Broadly speaking, ACE is a measure of the power of a tropical or subtropical storm multiplied by the length of time it existed. It is only calculated for full advisories on specific tropical and subtropical systems reaching or exceeding wind speeds of 39 miles per hour (63 km/h).

== Systems ==
=== Typhoon Sudal (Cosme) ===
- Very strong typhoon (JMA)
- Category 4 super typhoon (SSHWS)
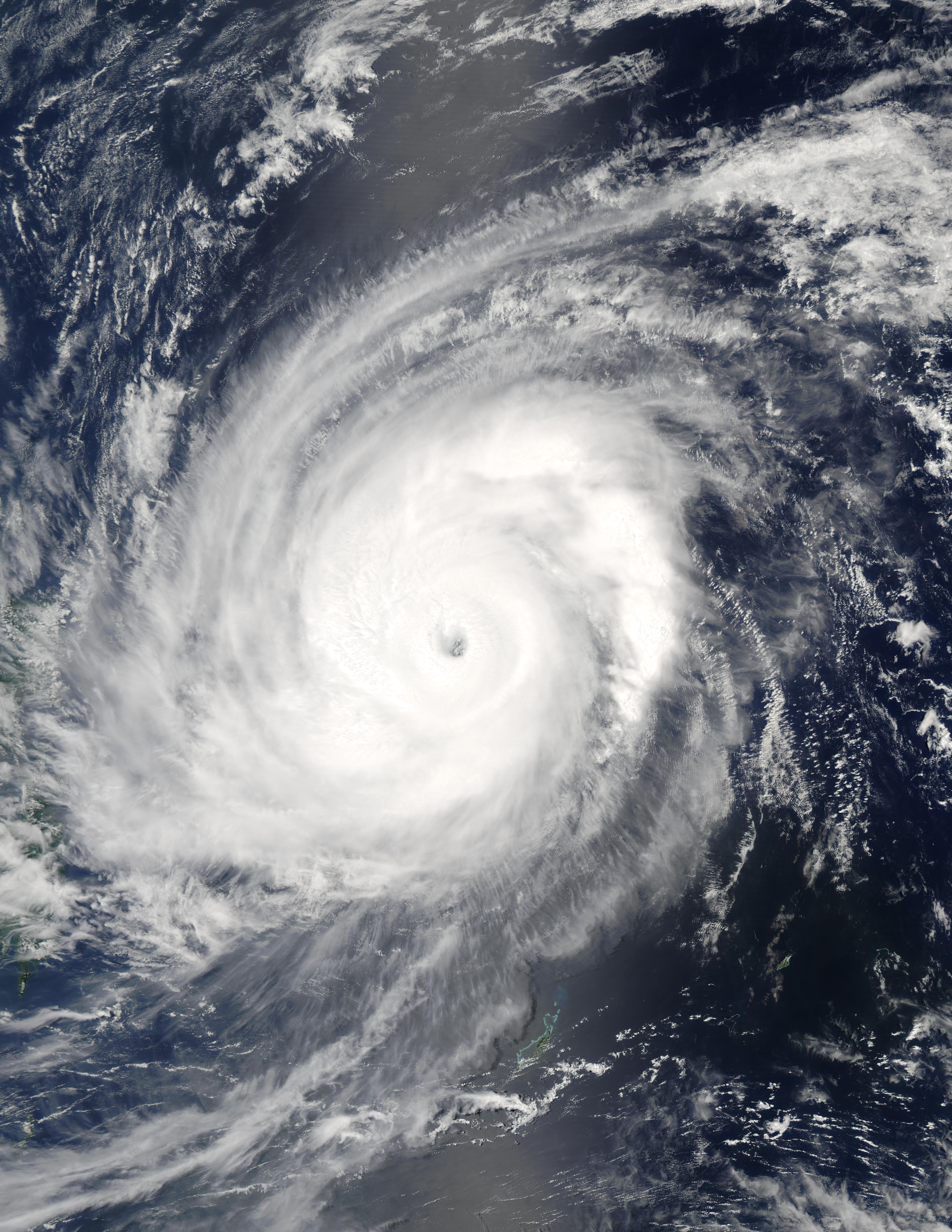
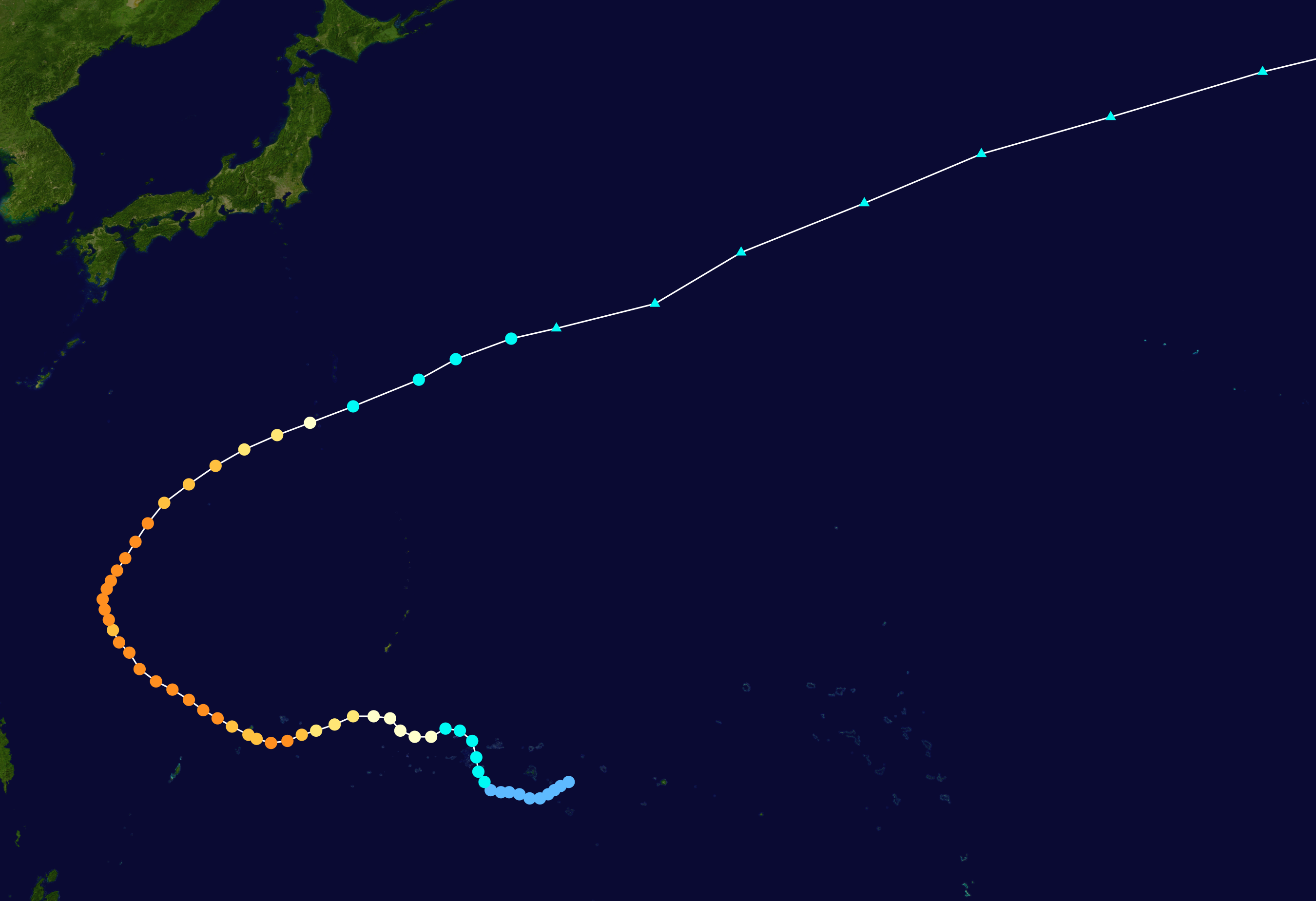
- Duration: April 4 – April 16
- Peak intensity: 165 km/h (105 mph) (10-min); 940 hPa (mbar)

On April 5, Tropical Depression 03W began its life between Chuuk and Pohnpei. As it drifted to the northwest, it strengthened into a tropical storm. Sudal turned to the west, and steadily intensified to become a typhoon on April 6. On the April 9, with maximum sustained winds of 115 kn/130 mph, Typhoon Sudal hit the island of Yap. After ravaging the island, Sudal reached a peak of 130 kn/150 mph winds. The typhoon turned to the northeast and became extratropical early on April 16.

Yap experienced catastrophic damage, with 90% of buildings destroyed, 1,500 left homeless, but fortunately no fatalities. Sudal is a Korean word meaning otter.

=== Typhoon Nida (Dindo) ===
- Very strong typhoon (JMA)
- Category 5 super typhoon (SSHWS)
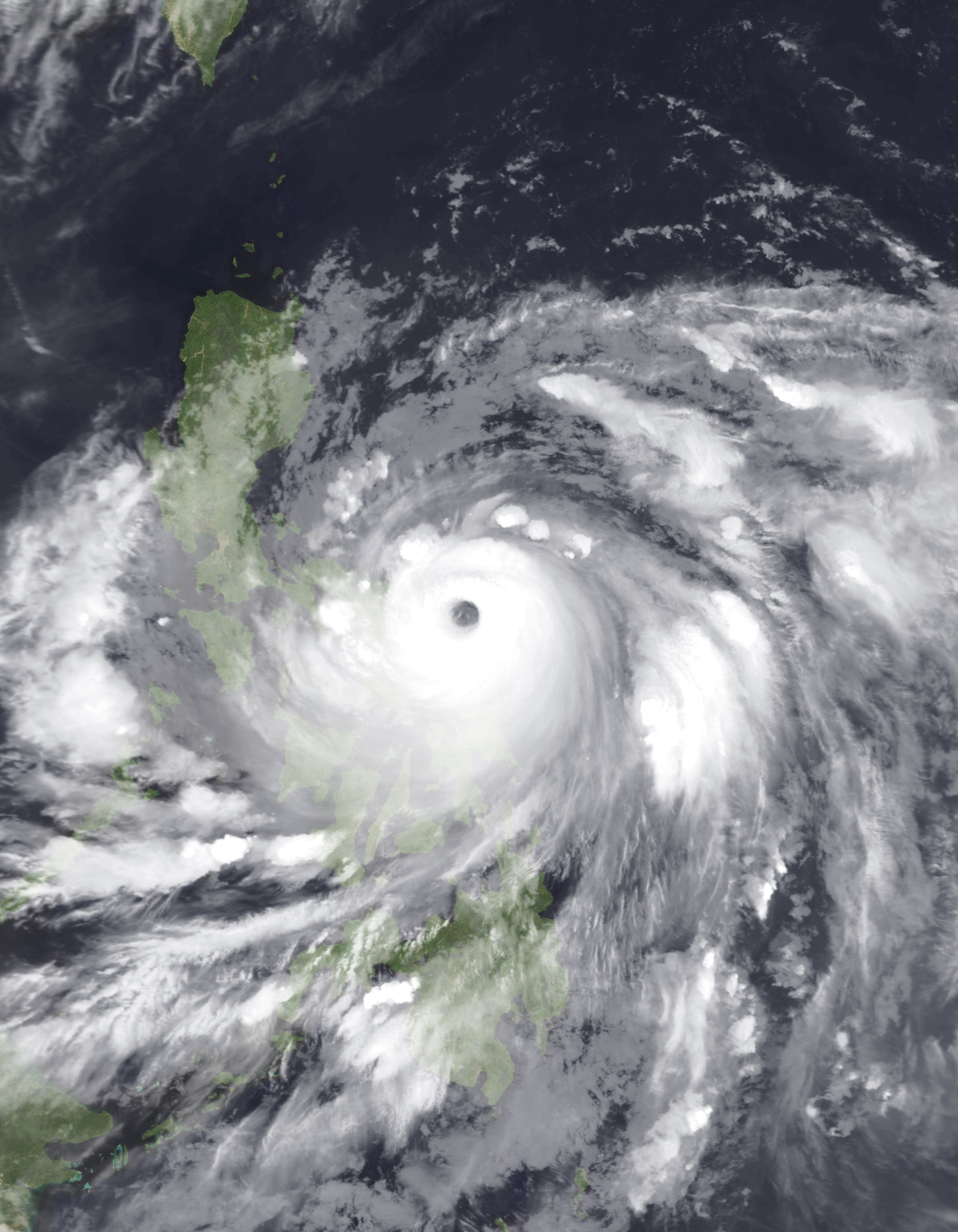
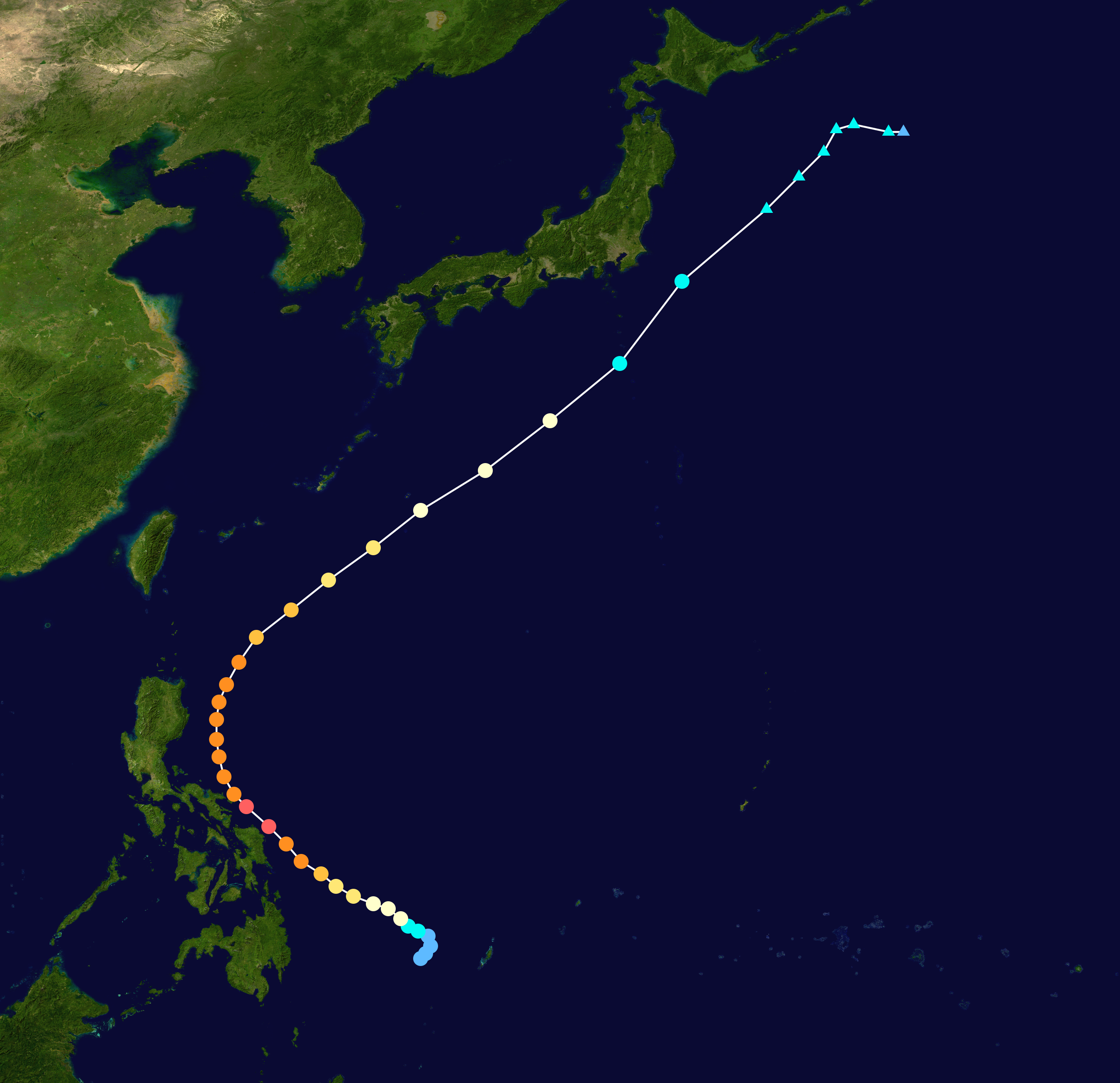
- Duration: May 13 – May 21
- Peak intensity: 175 km/h (110 mph) (10-min); 935 hPa (mbar)

A monsoon trough spawned Tropical Depression 04W east of the Philippines on May 13. The depression quickly strengthened, reaching tropical storm intensity on May 14 and typhoon status just six hours later. On May 15 and 16 while moving northwest towards the Philippine coast, Nida rapidly intensified to a 140 kn/160 mph super typhoon, and crossed the eastern Philippines shortly thereafter. Nida weakened slightly over the islands, and began to move to the north and northeast in response to a break in the subtropical ridge. It became extratropical on May 21 east of Japan, after causing 31 deaths and about $1.3 million in damage. Nida is a Thai female name.

In the Philippines, evacuation centers were opened to accommodate 2,986 people. The typhoon approach canceled ferry operations stranding 15,057 passengers. In Taiwan, forecasters at the Central Weather Bureau issued a typhoon warning as forecast models predicted a high probability of the typhoon hitting Taiwan.

=== Severe Tropical Storm Omais (Enteng) ===
- Severe tropical storm (JMA)
- Tropical storm (SSHWS)
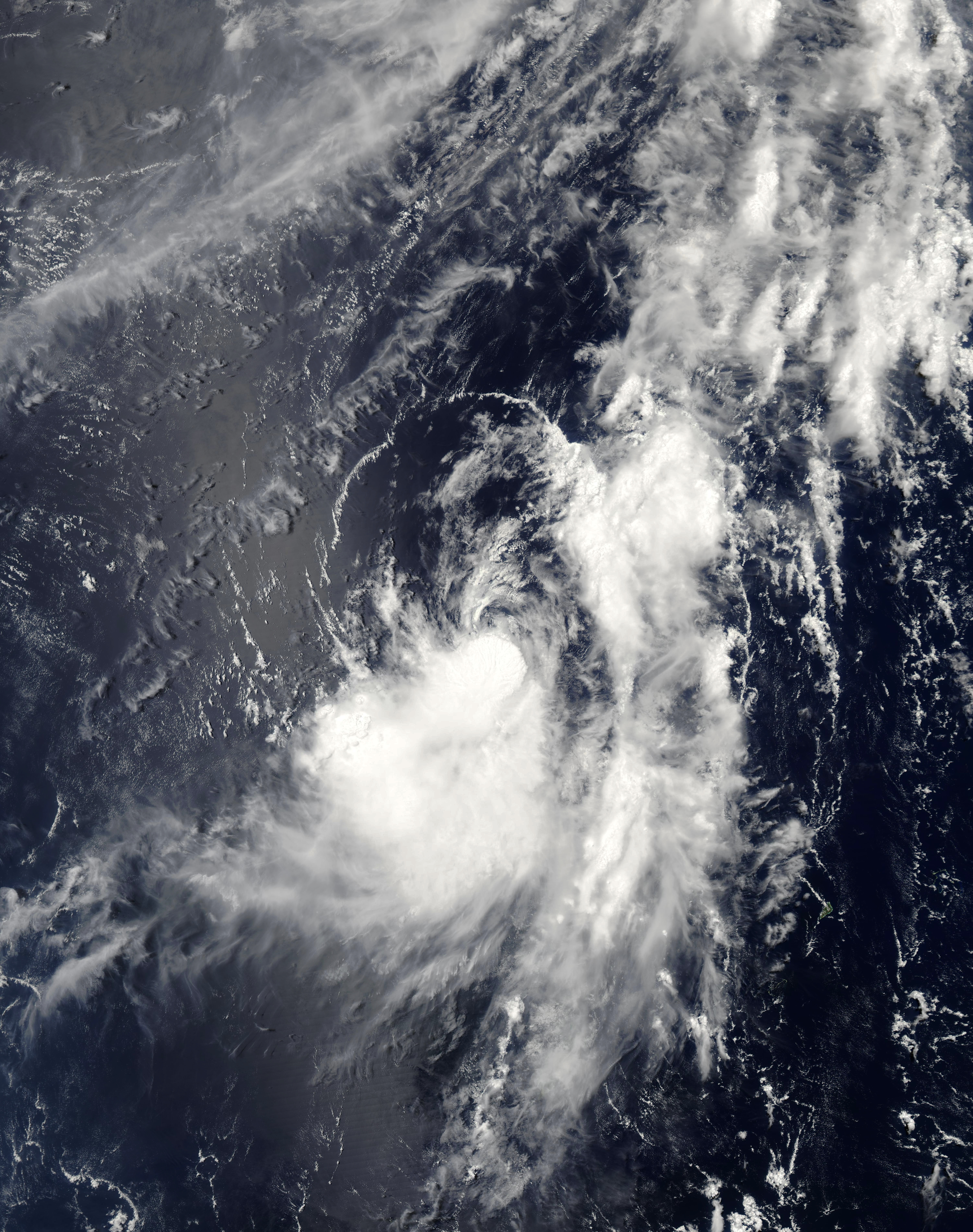
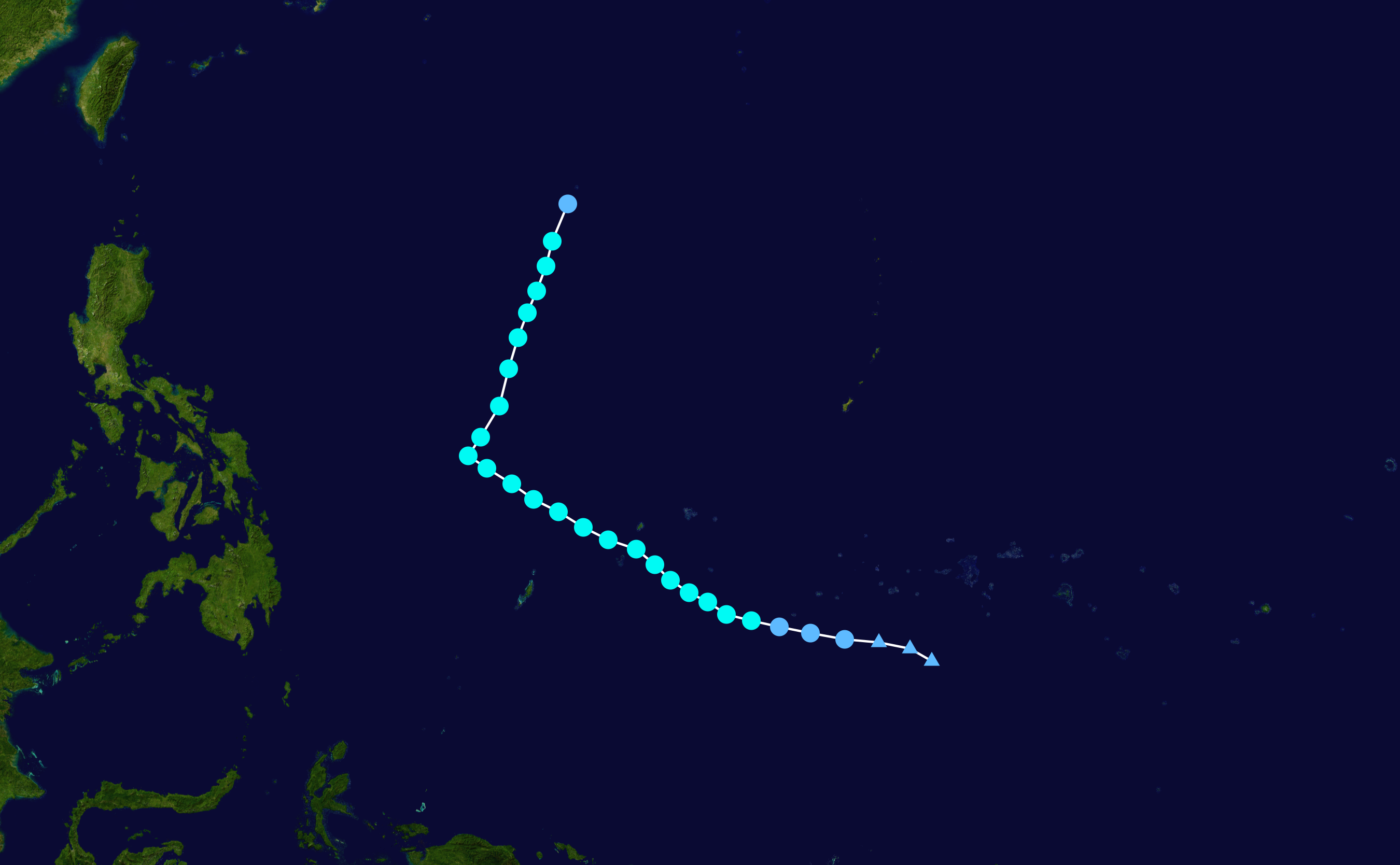
- Duration: May 16 – May 22
- Peak intensity: 95 km/h (60 mph) (10-min); 985 hPa (mbar)

A tropical disturbance southwest of Chuuk organized into a tropical depression on May 16, one of 3 active tropical cyclones in the Western Pacific at the time. The depression developed quickly, reaching tropical storm status later that day and reaching a peak of 60 kn/70 mph winds three days later on May 19. A weakening ridge brought Omais northward, where it became extratropical on May 22.

Operationally, Omais was classified as a typhoon, but in post-analysis, it was dropped to a severe tropical storm. Omais is a Palauan word meaning 'wandering around'.

=== Typhoon Conson (Frank) ===
- Typhoon (JMA)
- Category 3 typhoon (SSHWS)
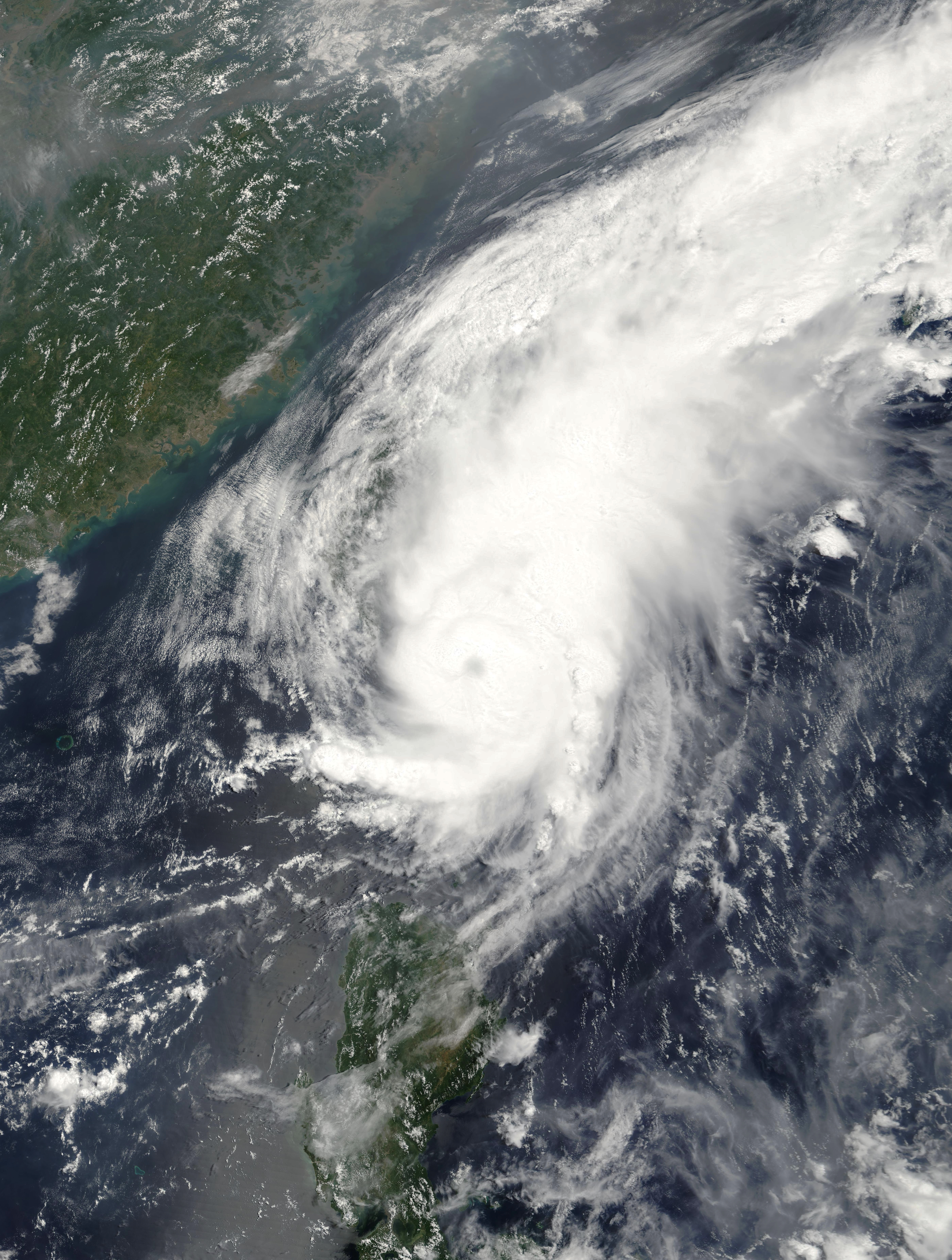
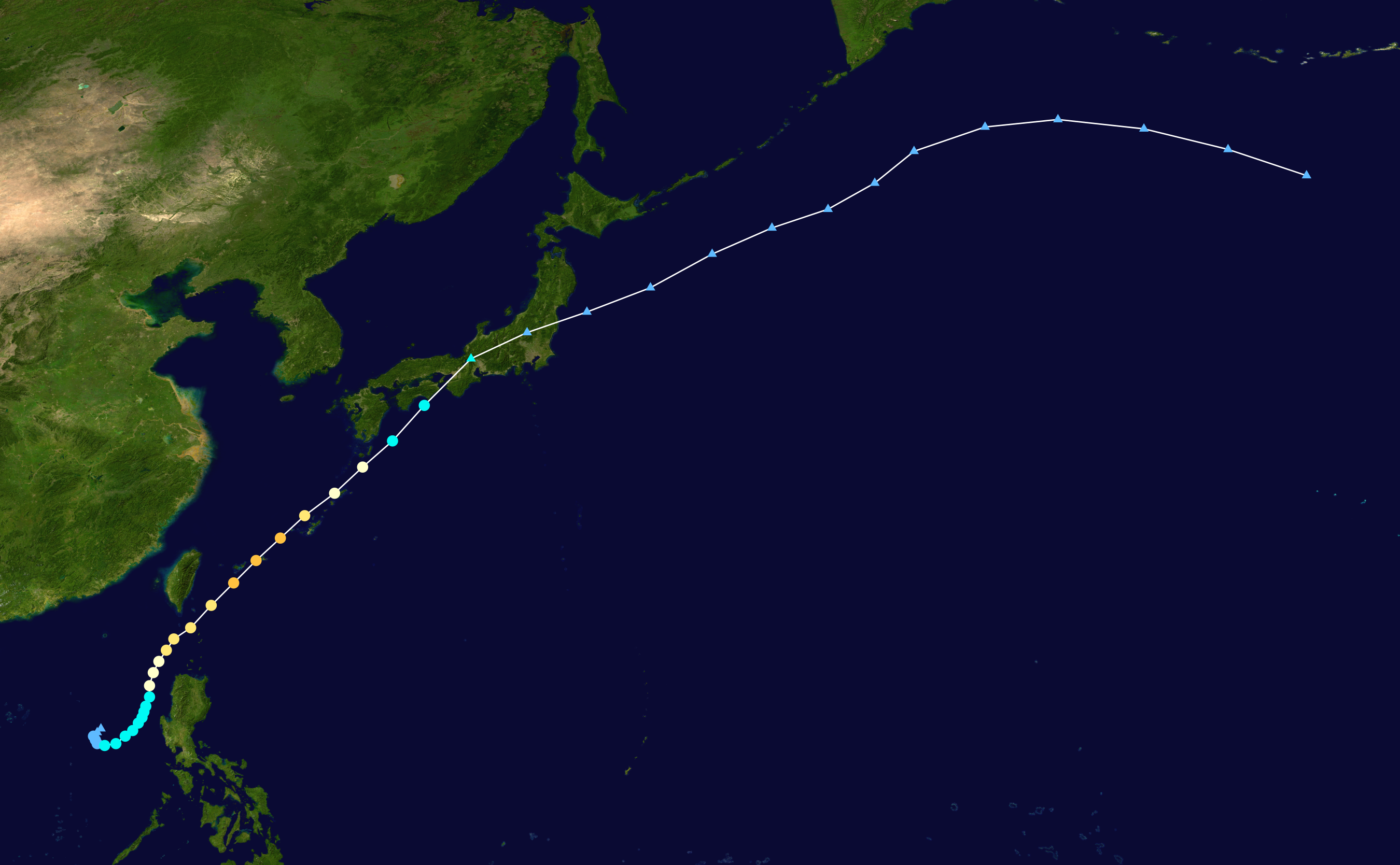
- Duration: June 4 – June 11
- Peak intensity: 150 km/h (90 mph) (10-min); 960 hPa (mbar)

In the South China Sea, a stationary area of disturbed weather developed into Tropical Depression 07W on June 4. It tracked eastward then northeastward, becoming a tropical storm on June 5 and a typhoon on June 7. Conson passed between Luzon and Taiwan, and peaked with 100 kn/115 mph winds on June 9. Conson weakened as it continued northeastward, and became extratropical on June 11 near Japan without causing any reported damage. Conson is an area in Vietnam containing many historical monuments.

=== Severe Tropical Storm Chanthu (Gener) ===
- Severe tropical storm (JMA)
- Category 1 typhoon (SSHWS)
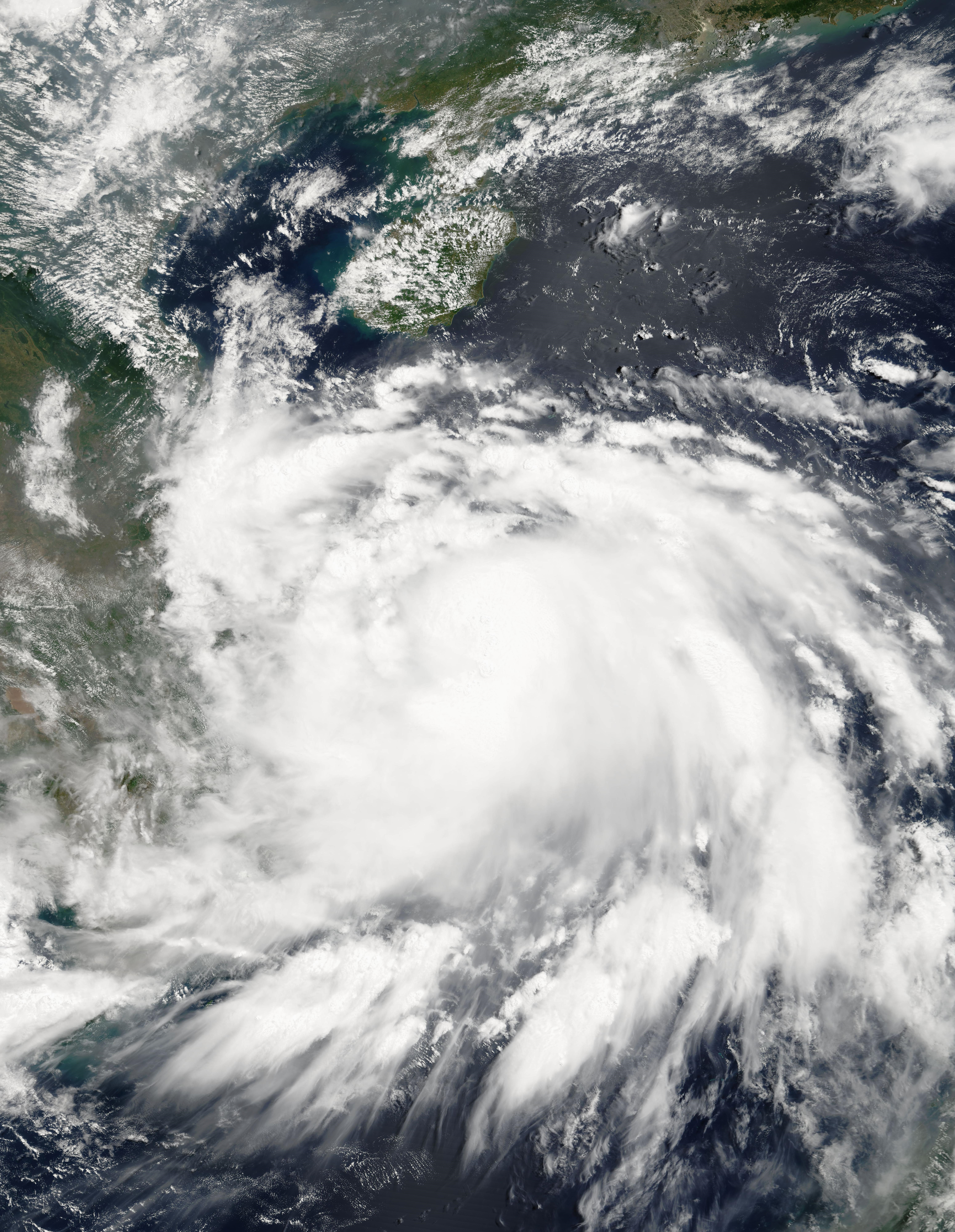
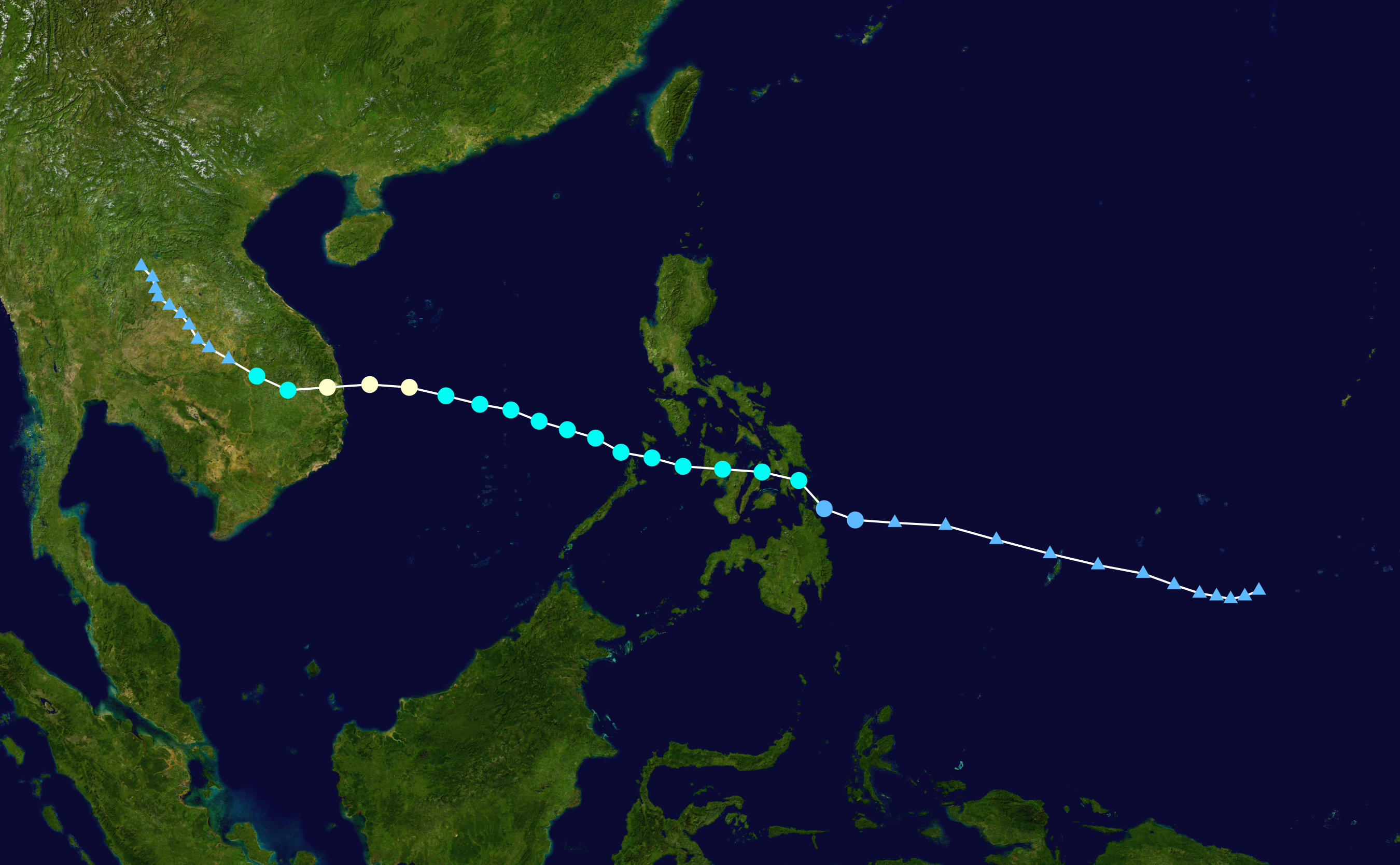
- Duration: June 7 – June 15
- Peak intensity: 110 km/h (70 mph) (10-min); 975 hPa (mbar)

Originating from an area of low pressure on June 5, 2004, Chanthu was first declared a tropical depression near southern Leyte Island, in the Philippines, on June 7. Tracking west-northwestward, the depression intensified into a tropical storm over the central Philippines before entering the South China Sea. Once over the warm waters of the sea, the system quickly intensified, attaining its peak 10-minute winds of 110 km/h (68 mph) and 1-minute winds of 140 km/h (87 mph). On June 12, the storm made landfall in Vietnam before quickly weakening over land. By June 13, the system had weakened to a tropical depression and dissipated two days later.

During the time Typhoon Chanthu affected Vietnam, the highest sustained wind speed recorded on land was 65 km/h (40 mph) in An Nhơn (Bình Định), and the lowest recorded atmospheric pressure was 988.9 hPa (29.20 inHg) in Quy Nhơn.

In Vietnam, Chanthu wrought substantial damage and killed 38 people. Damage from the storm was estimated at 125 billion Vietnam dong (US$7.9 million), mostly from agricultural losses. The remnants of Chanthu also brought heavy rains to Cambodia, estimated to have exceeded 400 mm (16 in).

=== Typhoon Dianmu (Helen) ===
- Very strong typhoon (JMA)
- Category 5 super typhoon (SSHWS)
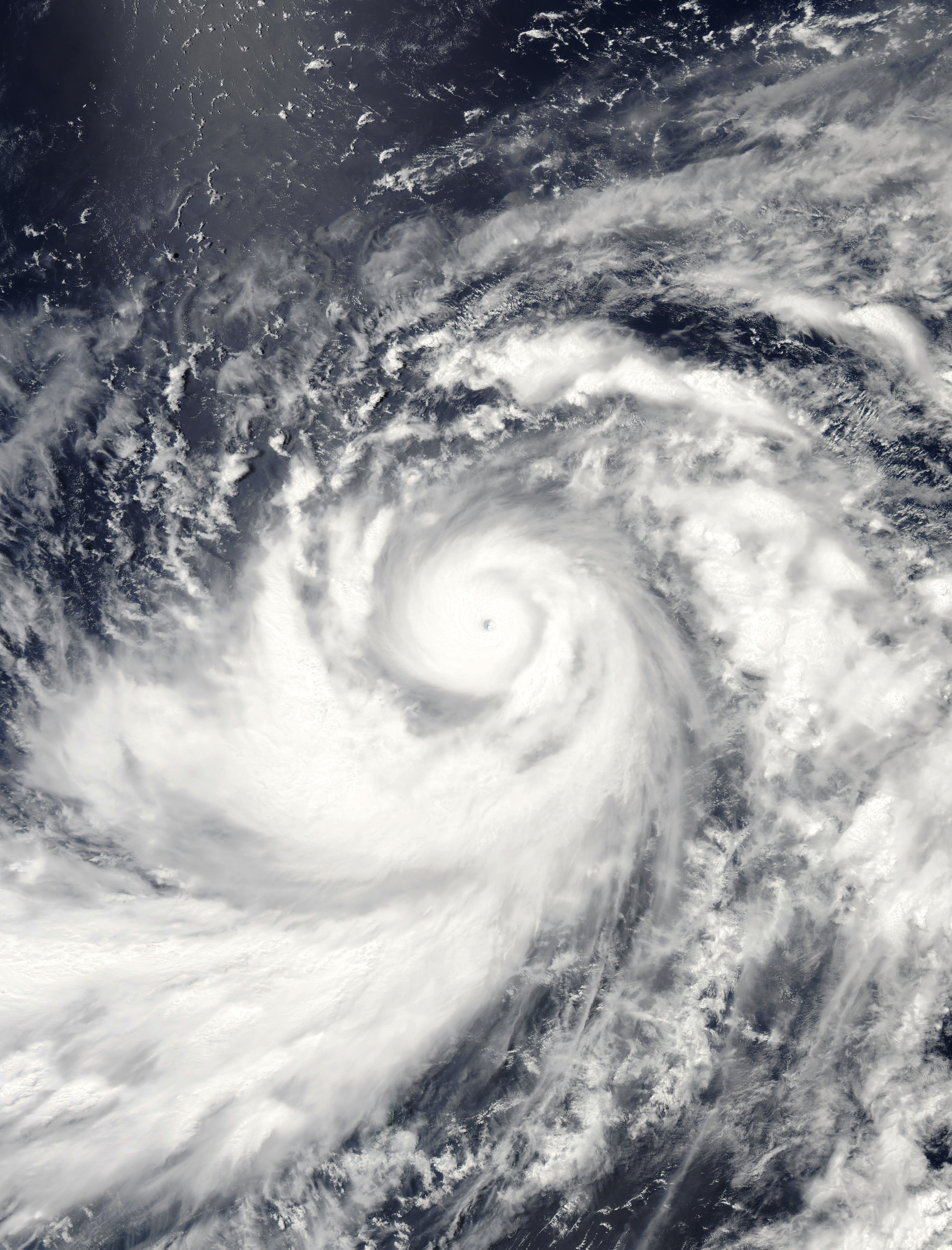
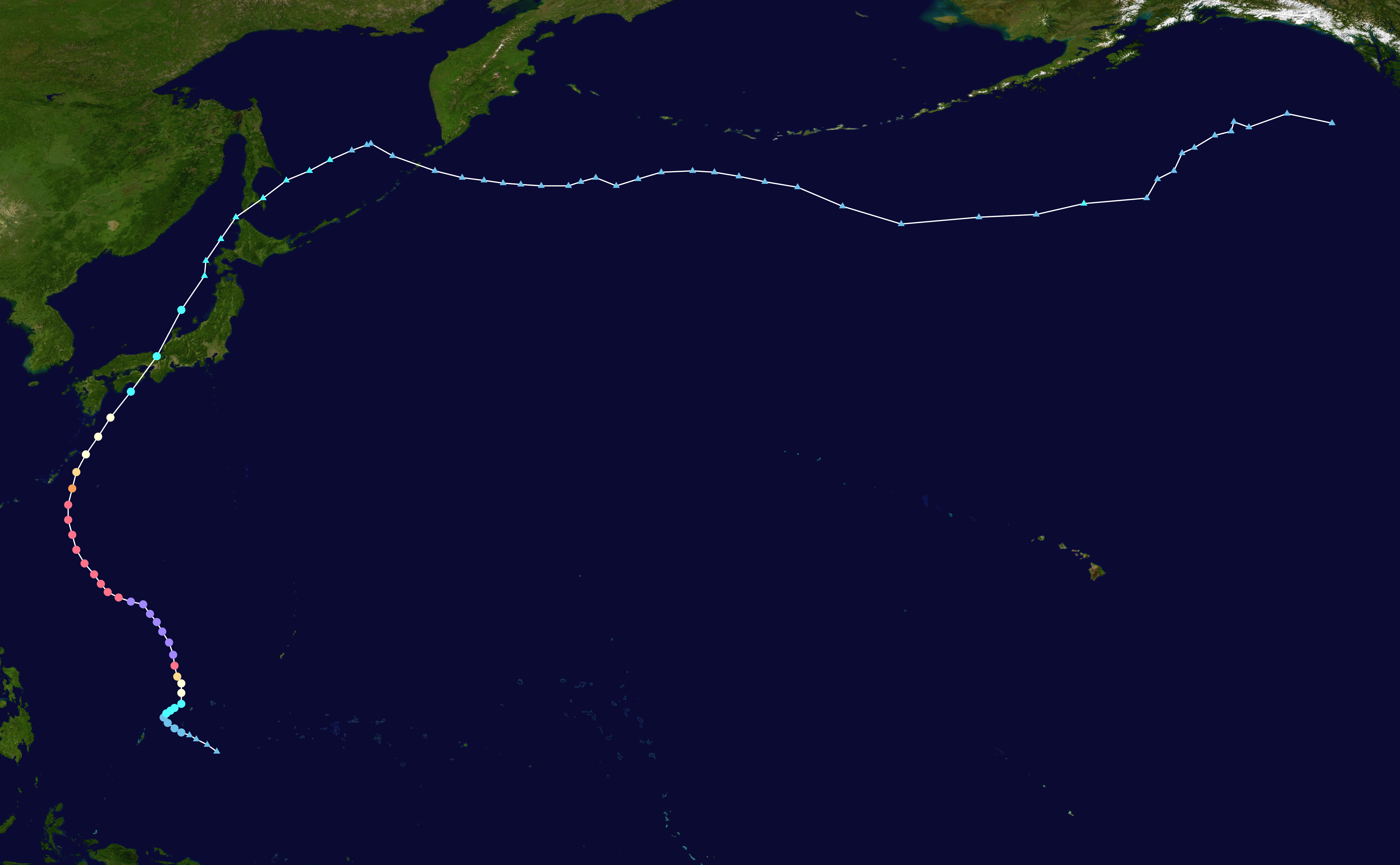
- Duration: June 11 – June 21
- Peak intensity: 185 km/h (115 mph) (10-min); 915 hPa (mbar)

Tropical Depression 09W, which developed from the monsoon trough on June 13, headed north in the open Western Pacific. On the June 15 and 16, Dianmu rapidly intensified from a 70 kn/80 mph typhoon to a 155 kn/180 mph super typhoon, one of nine typhoons since 1990 to reach that intensity. It lost some organization on June 18, but re-strengthened on June 19 to a super typhoon while south of Okinawa. Some dry air weakened Dianmu as it continued its northward movement, and hit southern Japan as a 55 kn/65 mph tropical storm on June 21. Dianmu became extratropical that night after causing 3 deaths. Dianmu is the name of the goddess of thunder and lightning in Chinese folklore.

=== Typhoon Mindulle (Igme) ===
- Very strong typhoon (JMA)
- Category 4 typhoon (SSHWS)
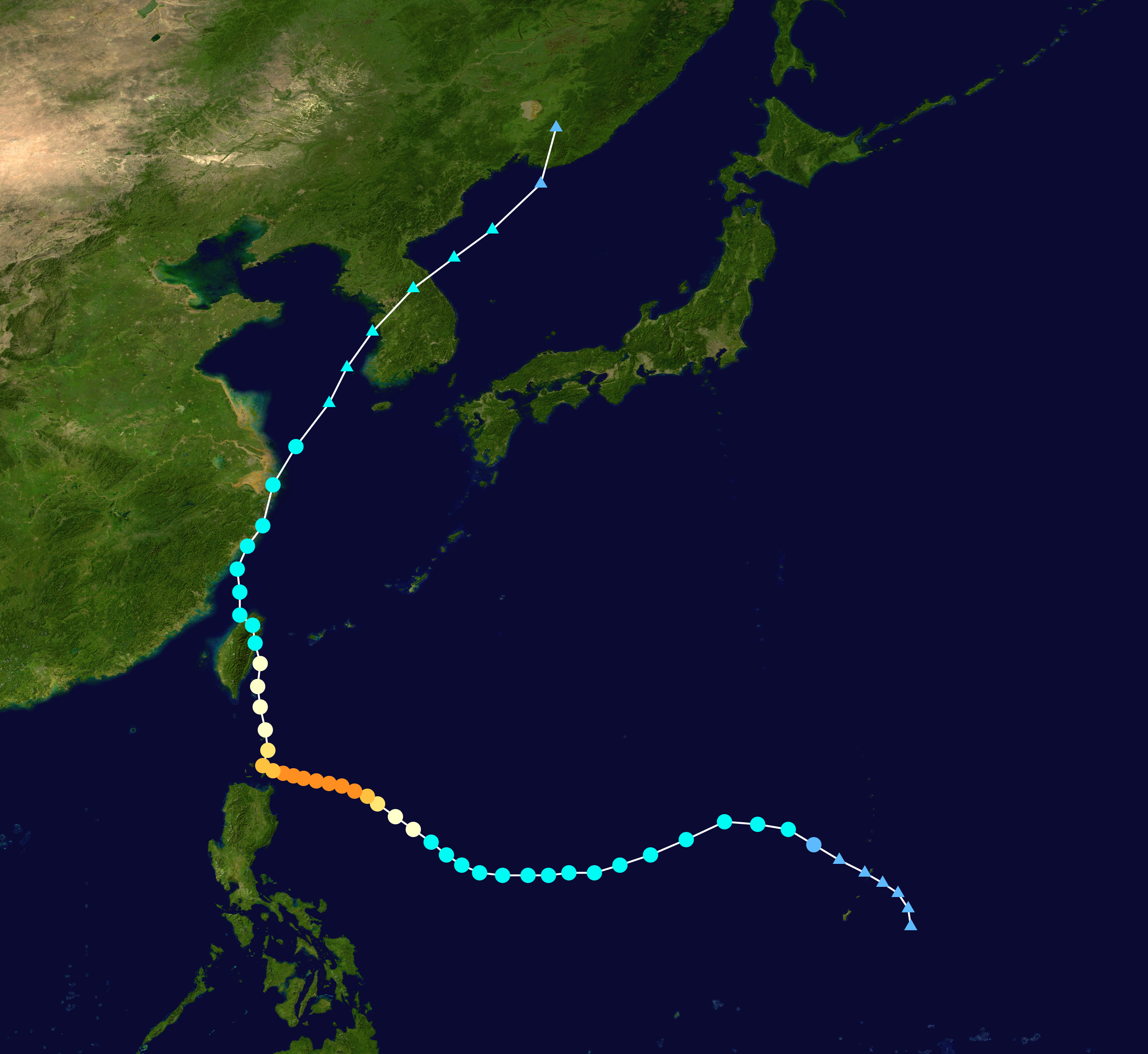
- Duration: June 21 – July 4
- Peak intensity: 175 km/h (110 mph) (10-min); 940 hPa (mbar)

The monsoon trough spawned a tropical depression on June 23 near Guam. It tracked westward, becoming a tropical storm that night but slowly strengthening as it continued westward due to vertical wind shear. When the shear abated, Mindulle quickly intensified, reaching typhoon strength on June 27 and peaking at 125 kn/145 mph winds on June 28. Land interaction with Luzon to its south weakened Mindulle, and the typhoon weakened as it turned northward. On July 1, Mindulle hit eastern Taiwan, and after accelerating to the northeast became extratropical near South Korea on July 4.

Mindulle caused 56 deaths, with $833 million in damage in its path (2004 USD). Mindulle is the Korean word for the dandelion.

=== Typhoon Tingting ===
- Typhoon (JMA)
- Category 1 typhoon (SSHWS)
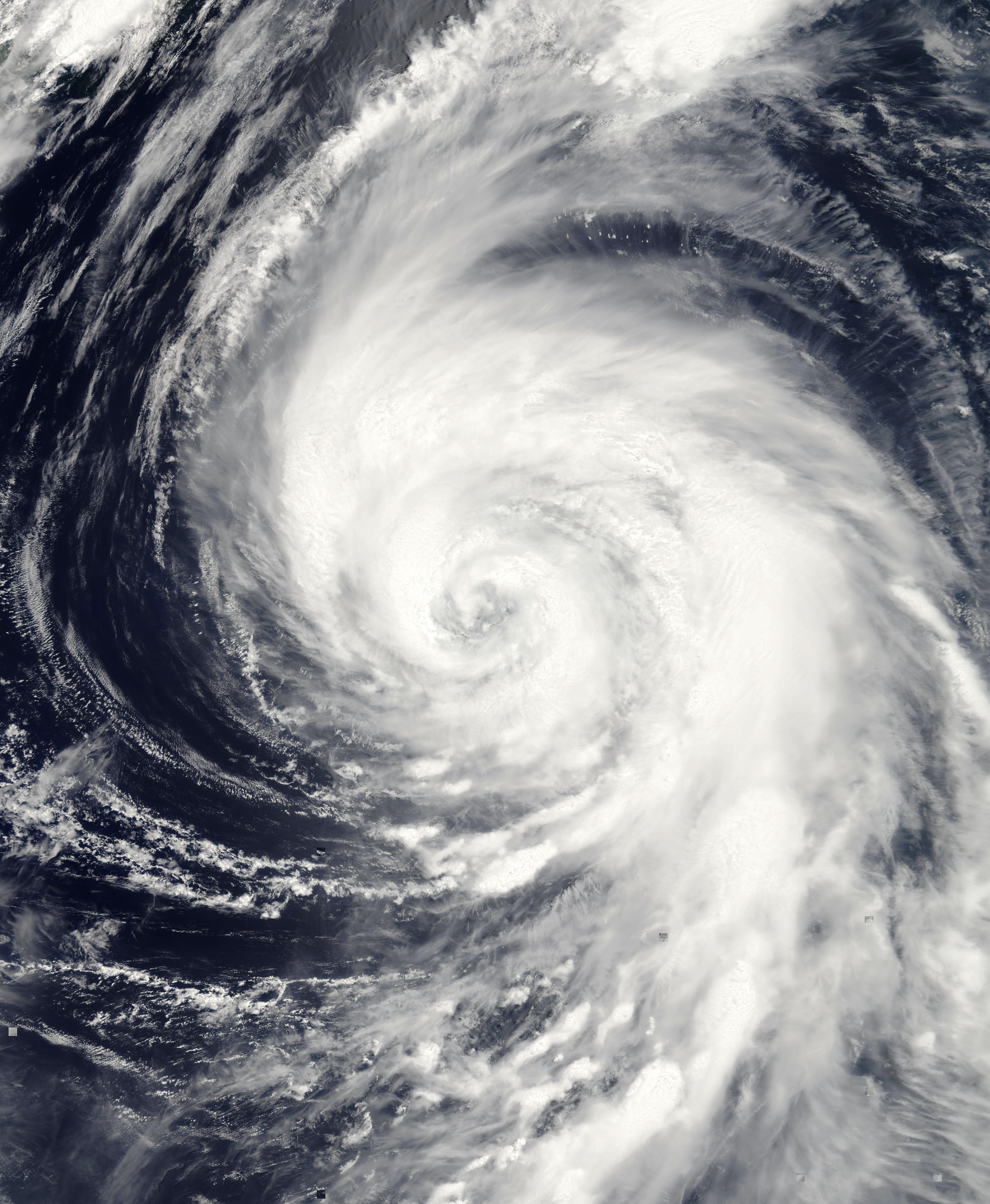
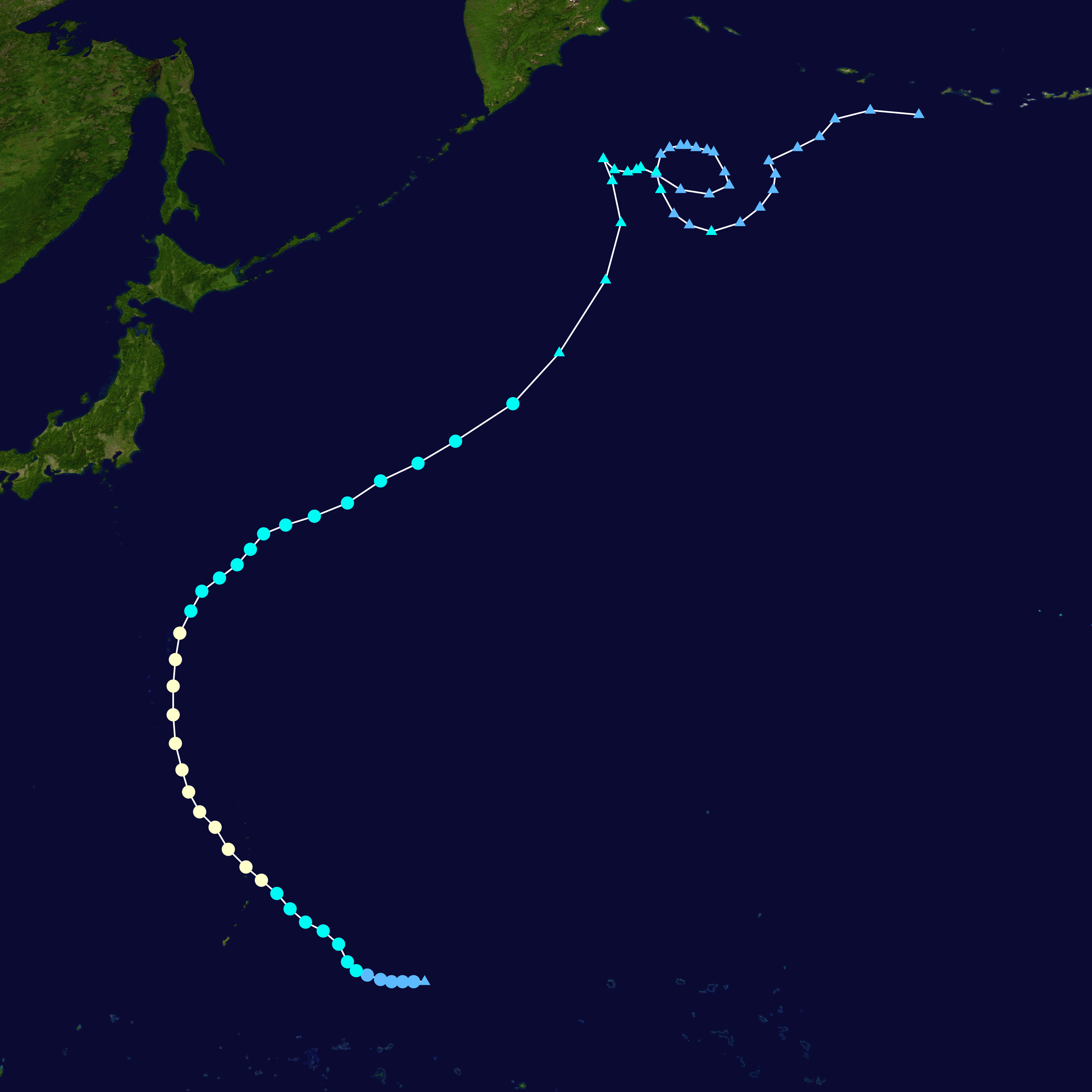
- Duration: June 25 – July 4
- Peak intensity: 150 km/h (90 mph) (10-min); 955 hPa (mbar)

Tropical Depression 11W, which developed from the monsoon trough on June 25, steadily strengthened as it tracked to the northwest, and reached tropical storm status on June 26. Tingting passed Saipan on June 27, and reached typhoon status early on June 28. After maximum sustained winds peaked at 80 kn/90 mph, the typhoon turned to the northeast, where it became extratropical on July 3 after causing 3 deaths on Saipan. Tingting is a pet name for young girls in Chinese.

=== Tropical Storm Kompasu (Julian) ===
- Tropical storm (JMA)
- Tropical storm (SSHWS)
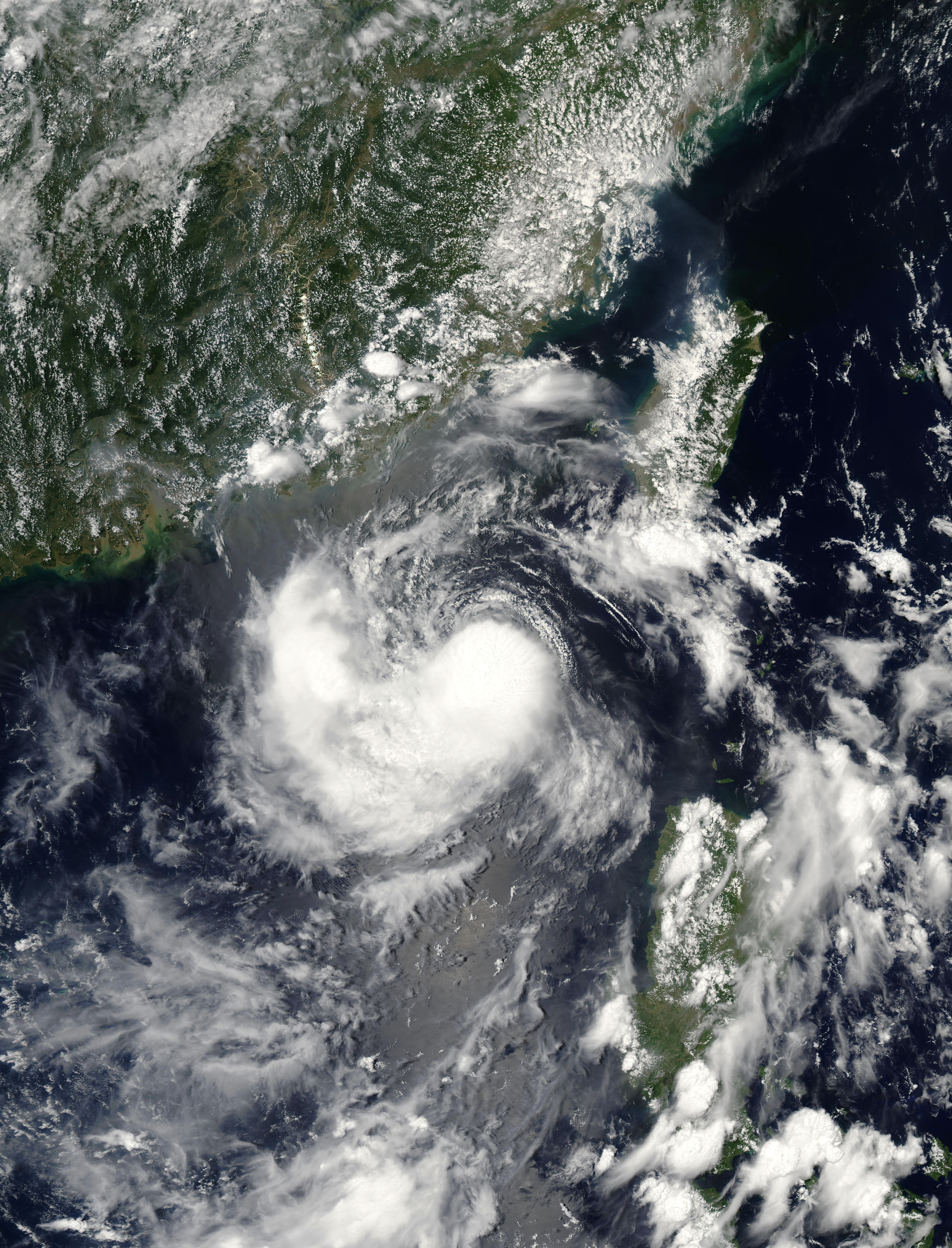
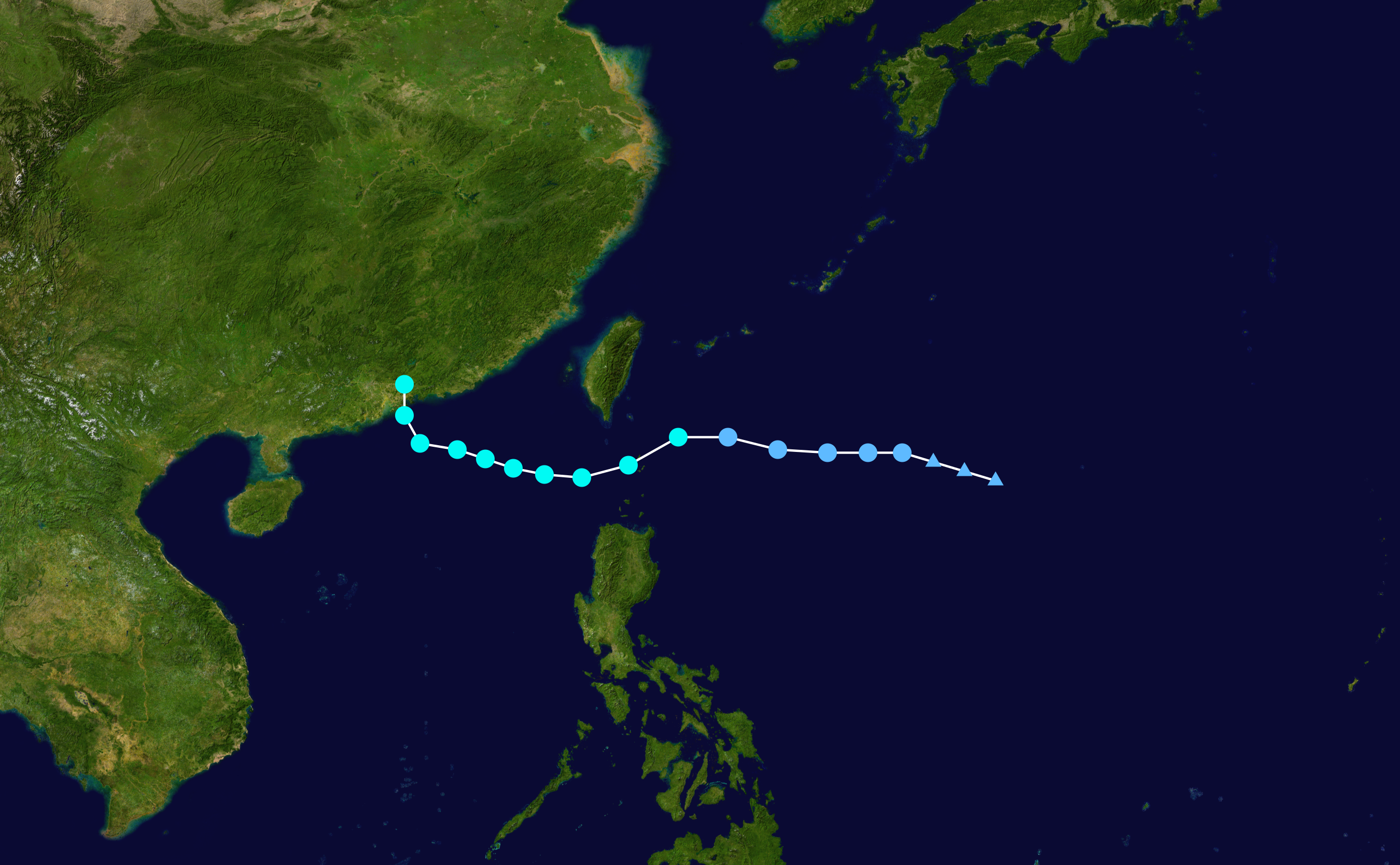
- Duration: July 12 – July 16
- Peak intensity: 85 km/h (50 mph) (10-min); 992 hPa (mbar)

A non-tropical system formed south of an upper-level vortex on July 3. It moved west until it weakened due to an intensifying high-pressure area north of it on July 8. The next day, it regenerated and strengthened into a tropical disturbance. Late on July 11, it entered in a place of favorable environments until it became a Tropical Depression 12W early on July 12. Area of thunderstorms and convection organized into Tropical Depression 12W on July 13. Under high vertical shear and with a very small circulation, it was not expected to strengthen further. However, as it tracked erratically westward, it intensified, peaking with 40 kn/50 mph winds on July 14. Kompasu turned northward, hit the eastern part of Hong Kong directly as a minimal tropical storm, and dissipated on July 16. Kompasu is the Japanese word for compass, and the name of the constellation Circinus.

=== Typhoon Namtheun ===
- Very strong typhoon (JMA)
- Category 4 typhoon (SSHWS)
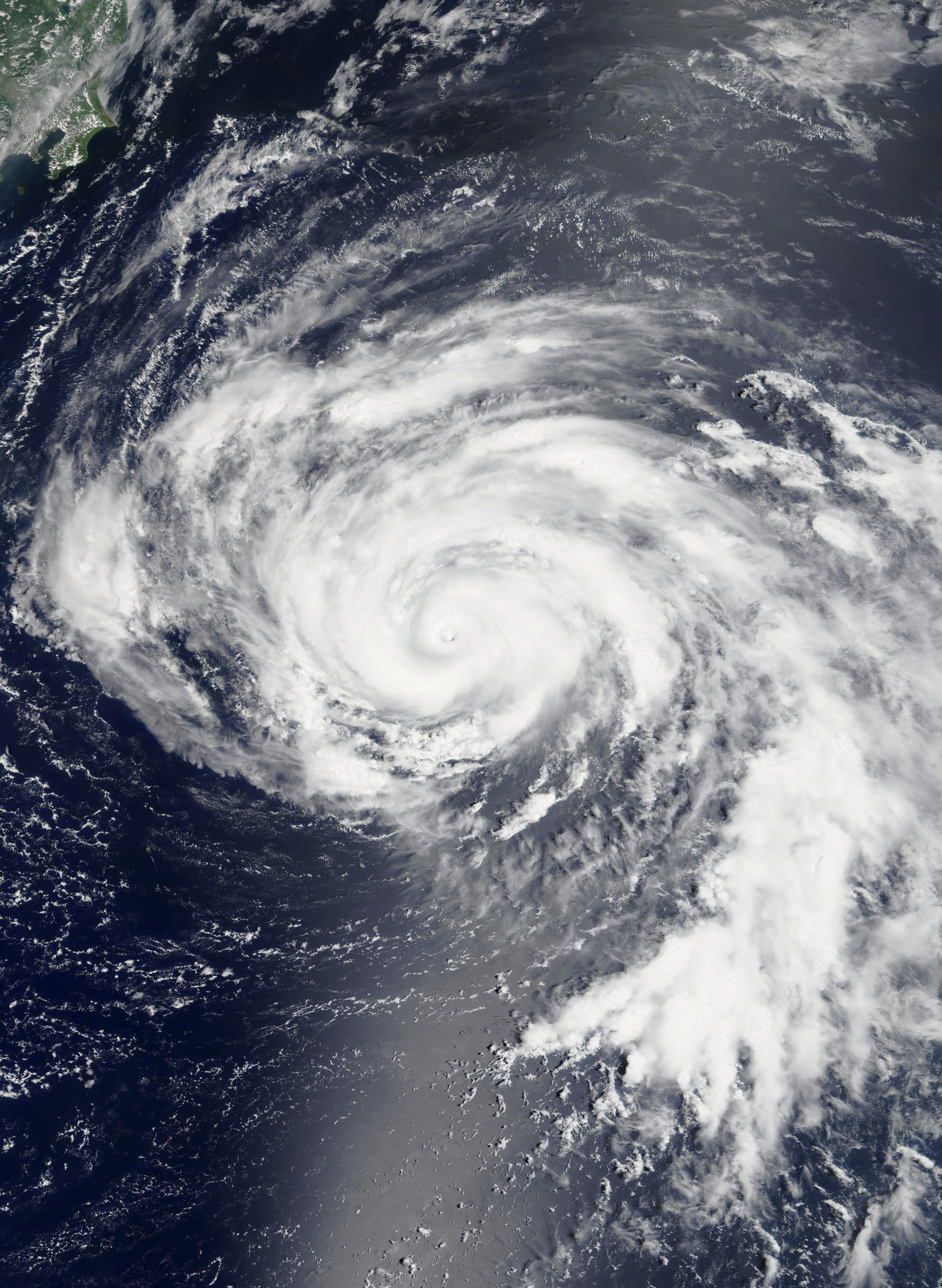
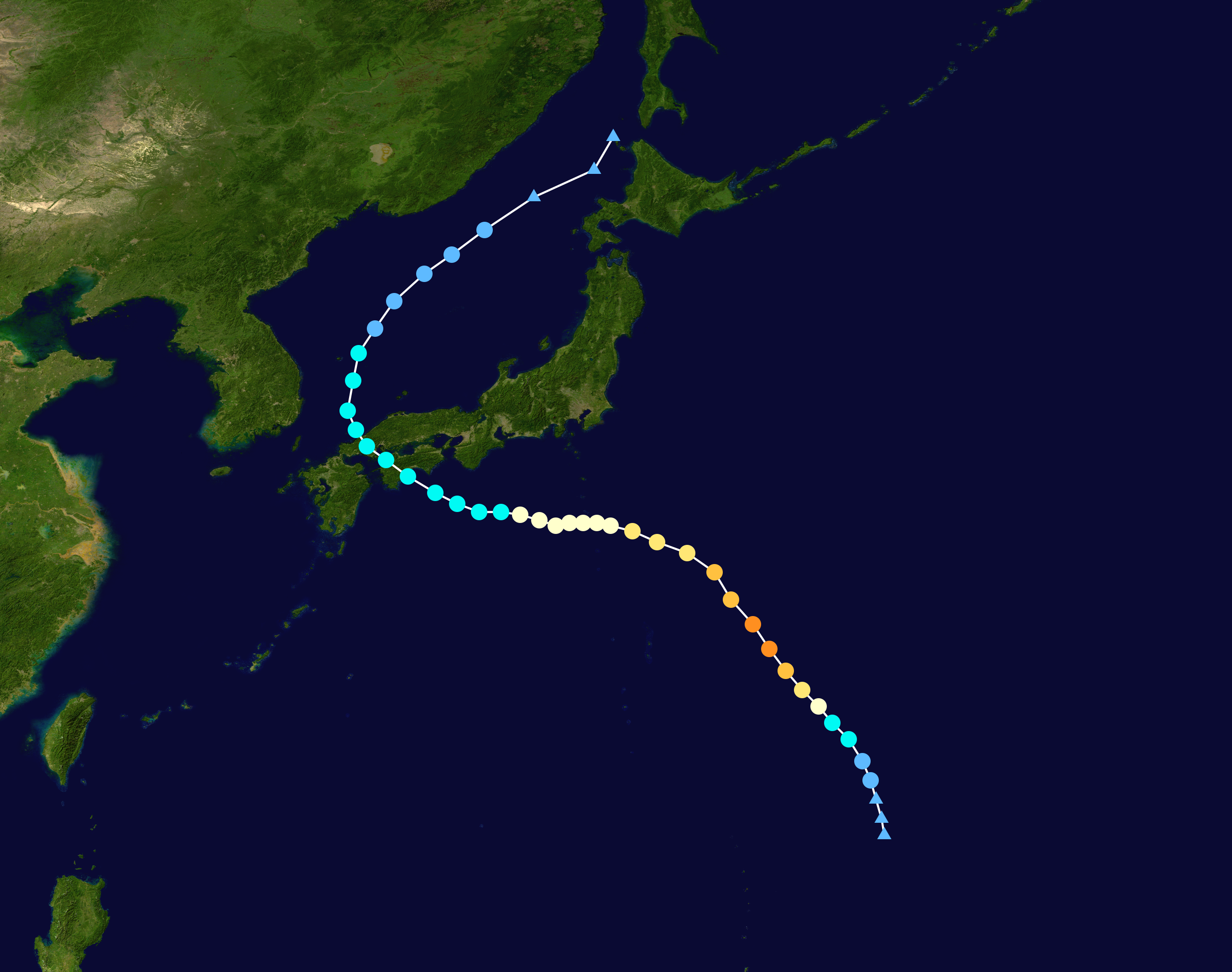
- Duration: July 24 – August 3
- Peak intensity: 155 km/h (100 mph) (10-min); 935 hPa (mbar)

Tropical Storm Namtheun, which formed on July 24, rapidly intensified on July 26 to a 115 kn/135 mph typhoon. Dry air approached the system from the south, and it weakened as it tracked northwest towards Japan. On July 31, Namtheun struck southwest Japan as a 55 kn/65 mph tropical storm, and became extratropical in the Sea of Japan on August 1. The storm caused no deaths or damage, with only 6 injuries. Namtheun is the name of a river in Laos.

=== Tropical Storm Malou ===
- Tropical storm (JMA)
- Tropical storm (SSHWS)
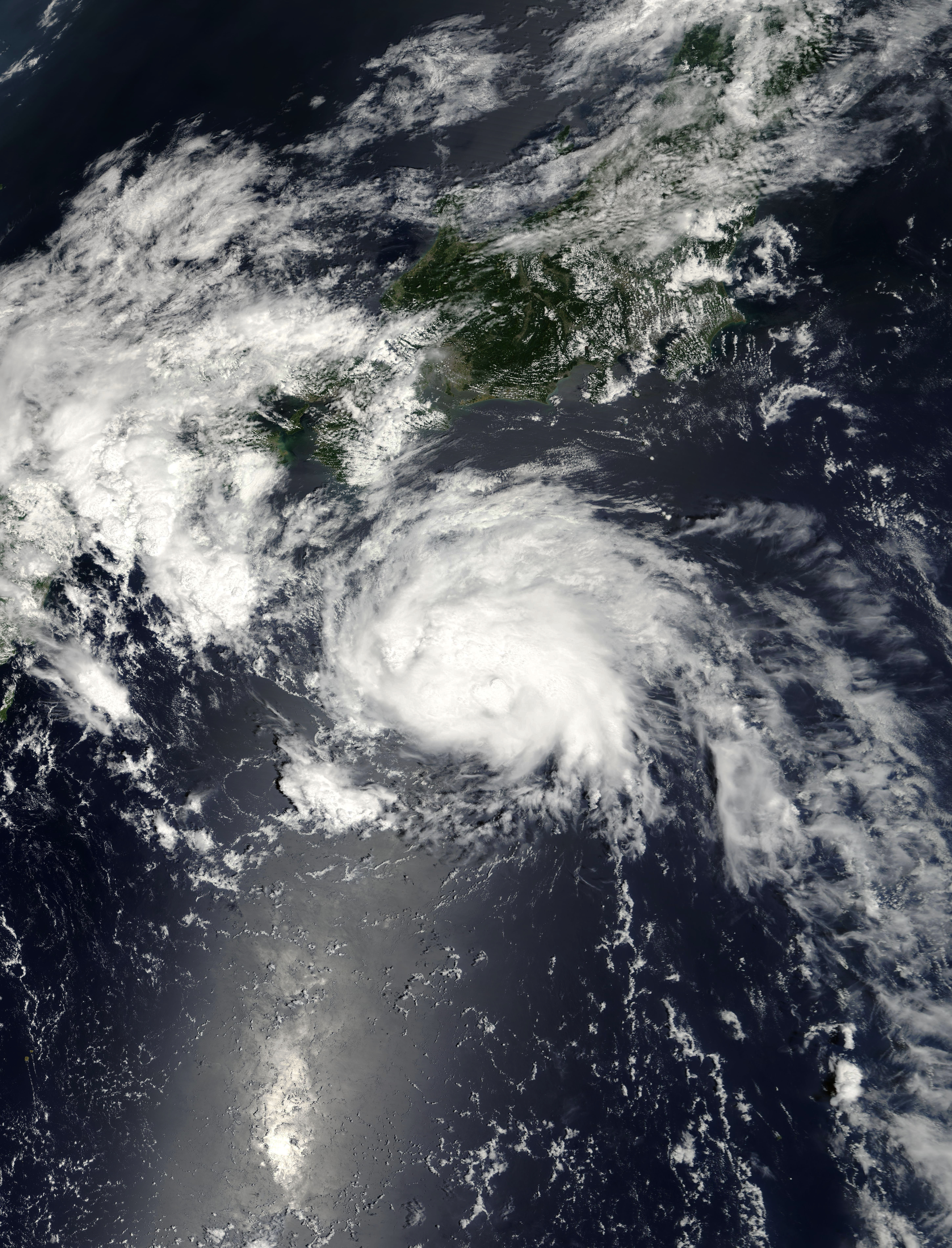
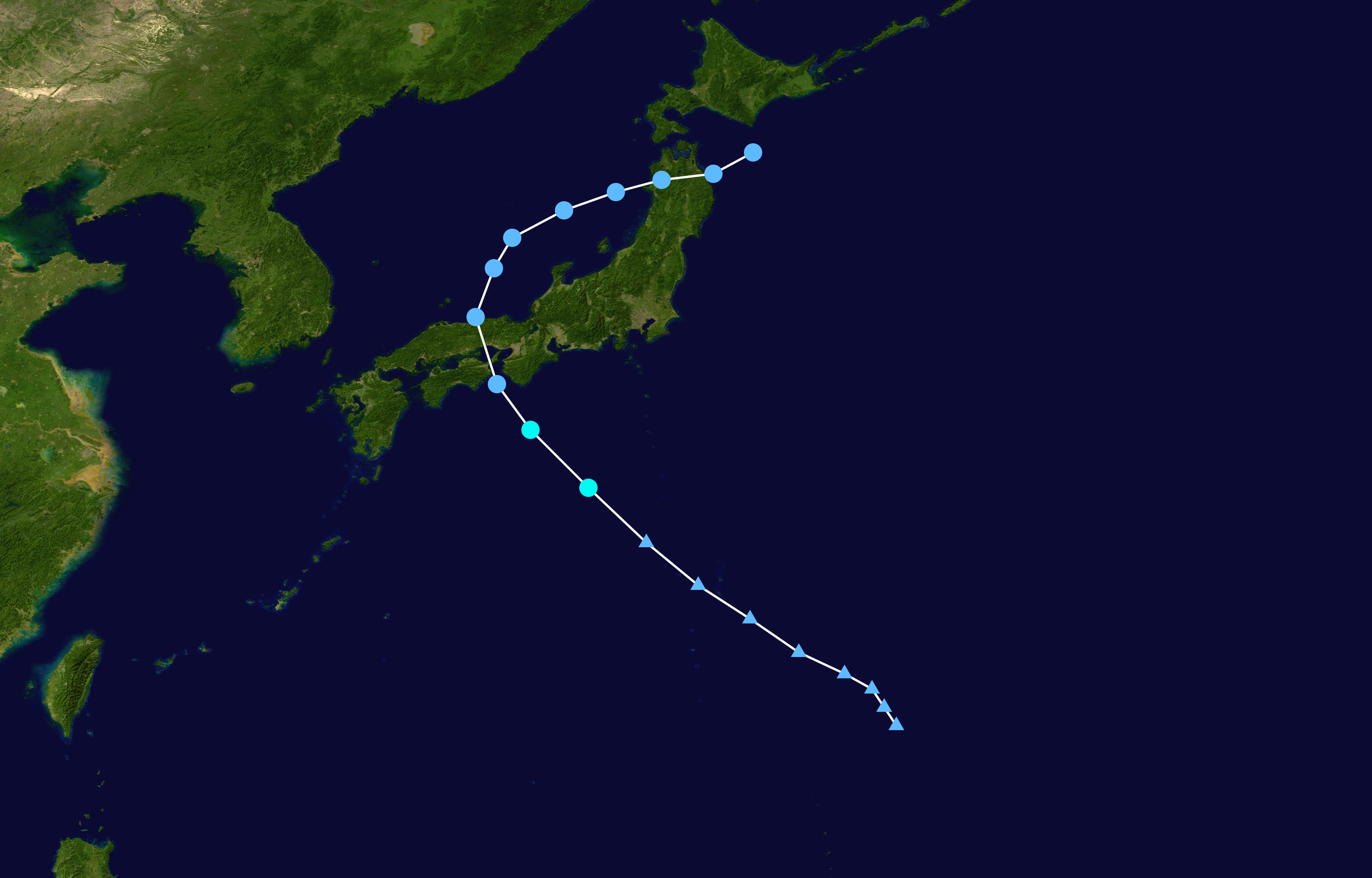
- Duration: August 2 – August 6
- Peak intensity: 75 km/h (45 mph) (10-min); 995 hPa (mbar)

A low-pressure area formed from the outflow of Typhoon Namtheun on July 29. An area of convection under moderate to high vertical wind shear developed into a tropical depression southeast of Japan on August 4. It became a minimal tropical storm before hitting central Japan on the night of August 4. Malou turned to the northeast and became extratropical in the Sea of Japan on August 5. Malou is the Chinese name for the mineral agate.

=== Typhoon Meranti ===
- Typhoon (JMA)
- Category 2 typhoon (SSHWS)
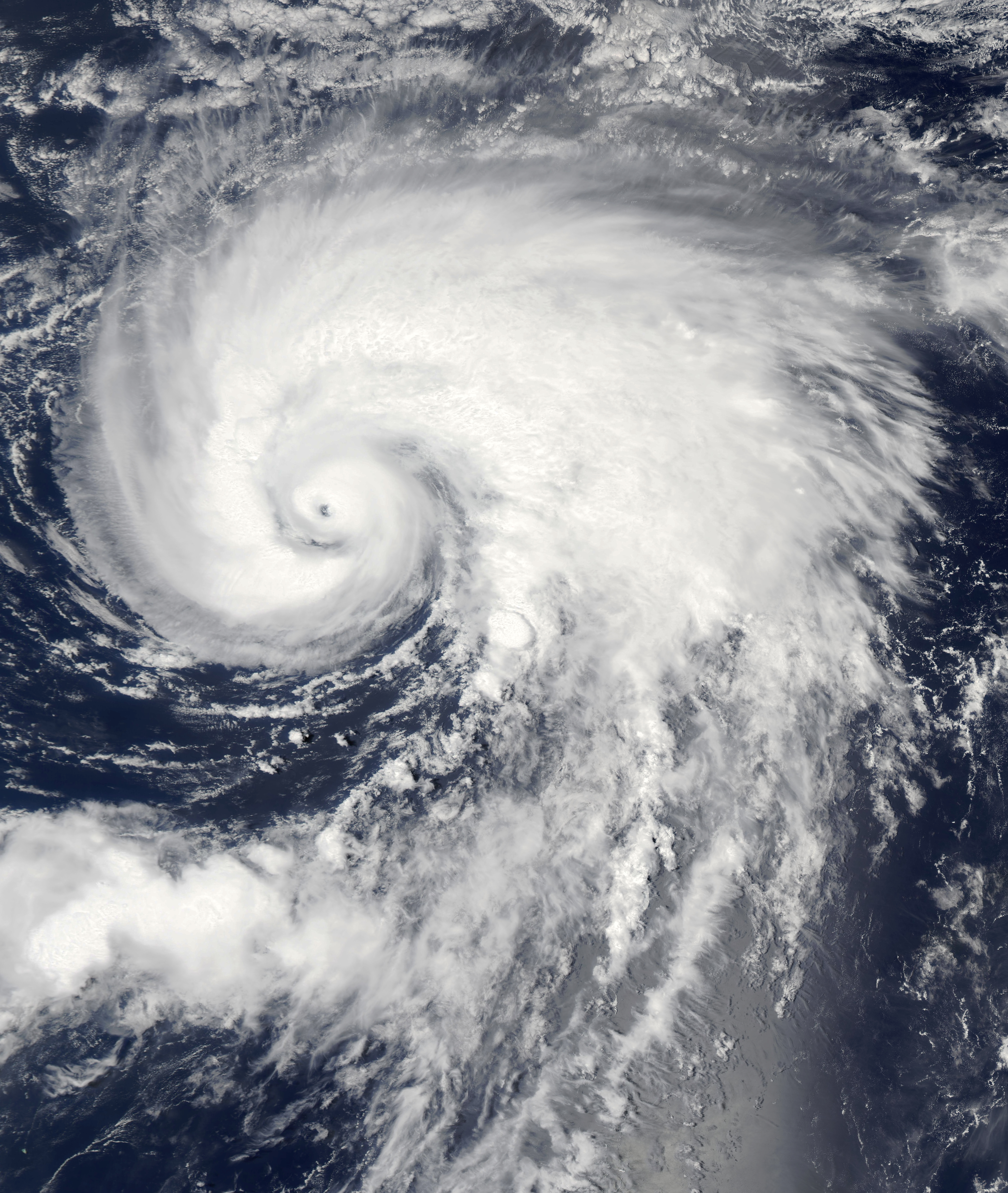
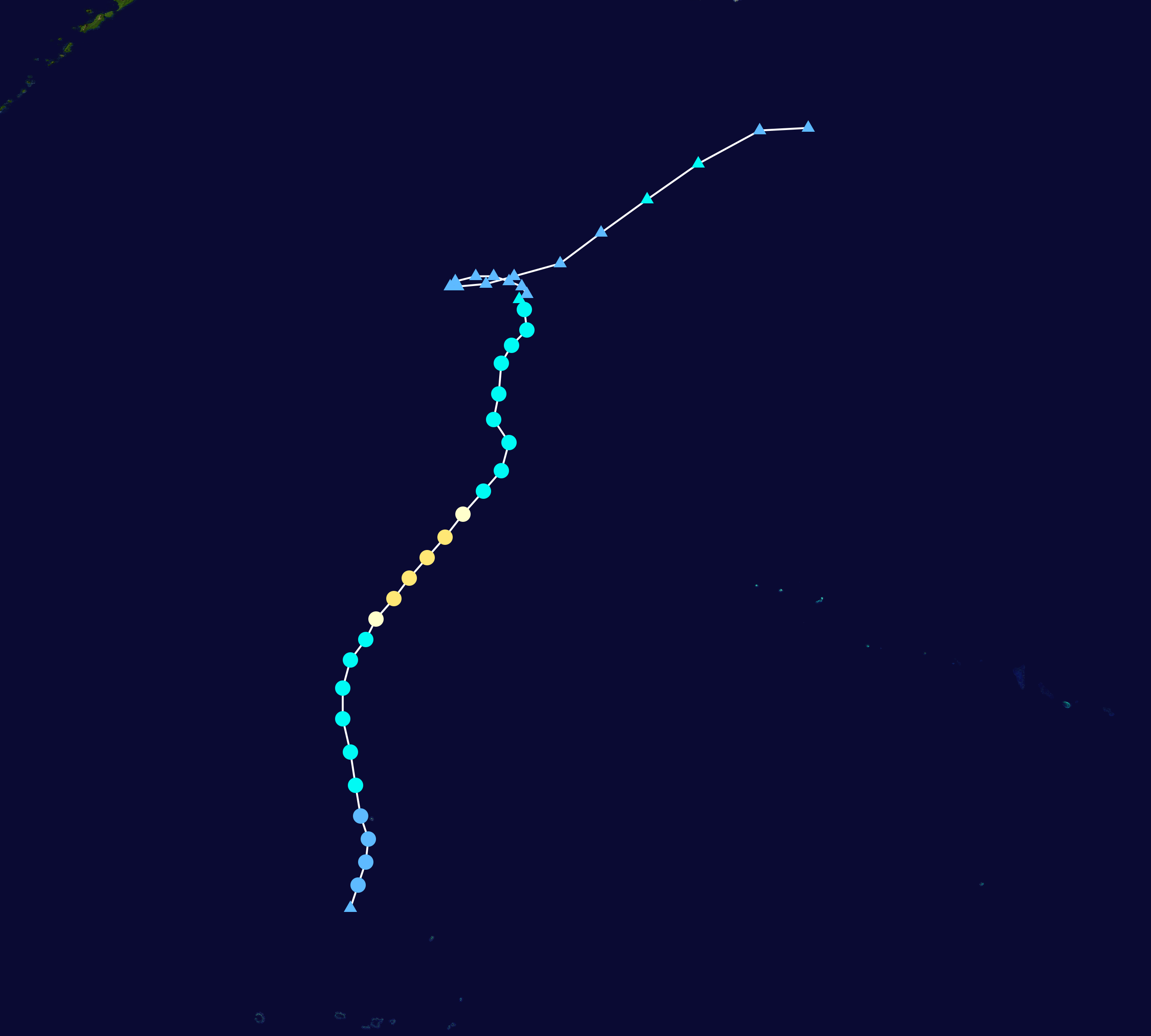
- Duration: August 2 – August 9
- Peak intensity: 140 km/h (85 mph) (10-min); 960 hPa (mbar)

Typhoon Meranti originated out of an area of low pressure about 475 km (295 mi) south of Wake Island on August 2. Little deep convection accompanied the weak system despite being situated within an area of moderate diffluence and weak to moderate wind shear. Initially, the system was thought to have been much closer to Wake Island; however, following the development of deep convection, the location of the center of circulation was corrected. Around 0000 UTC on August 3, the Japan Meteorological Agency (JMA), the Regional Specialized Meteorological Center for the western Pacific basin, designated the system as a tropical depression. Development continued as the depression moved into an area of divergence near a tropical upper-tropospheric trough cell. Several hours after the JMA issued their advisory on the depression, the Joint Typhoon Warning Center (JTWC) issued a Tropical Cyclone Formation Alert, stating that the system was likely to develop into a tropical storm within 24 hours. Later on August 3, the JTWC issued their first advisory on the storm, classifying it as Tropical Depression 14W. Located to the west of a mid-level ridge, the depression was steered towards the north. Early the next day, the JTWC upgraded 14W to a tropical storm; the JMA later upgraded it to a tropical storm around 1200 UTC. At that time, the storm received the name Meranti, a name that was contributed by Malaysia and refers to a type of tree. Little intensification took place until August 5, at which time convection became increasingly organized and underwent a brief period of rapid intensification. By 1200 UTC, both the JMA and JTWC upgraded Meranti to a typhoon. Several hours later, the storm reached its peak intensity; the JMA assessed it to have had winds of 140 km/h (87 mph) 10-minute winds) while the JTWC assessed it to have attained Category 2 status on the Saffir–Simpson hurricane scale with winds of 165 km/h (103 mph).

Upon attaining typhoon status, Meranti turned towards the northeast in response to a strengthening near-equatorial ridge south of the typhoon. Visible satellite images of the typhoon depicted a small, ragged eye within a well-developed cyclone. Gale-force winds extended 155 km (96 mi) at this time. Well-developed outflow allowed the storm to maintain its peak intensity for roughly 18 hours before dry air became entrained in the circulation. The combined effects of decreasing sea surface temperatures and increasing wind shear caused Meranti to quickly weaken. By 0600 UTC on August 6, the eye was no longer visible on satellite imagery and several hours later deep convection rapidly diminished, leading to both agencies downgrading the typhoon to a tropical storm. Later on August 6, the weakening trend briefly halted as outflow significantly improved due to an area of low pressure north of Meranti. However, wind shear drastically increased, displacing convection to the northwest of the circulation center. By this time, the storm began to undergo an extratropical transition. Due to the influence of a major shortwave trough approaching from the west, Meranti took a sharp northward turn. The JTWC issued their final advisory on the weakening cyclone around 0600 UTC on August 8. The JMA continued to monitor Meranti as a tropical cyclone until August 9. Shortly after becoming extratropical, the remnants of the storm executed a slow, counter-clockwise loop until August 12. Shortly after crossing the International Date Line on August 13, the storm was absorbed by a large non-tropical low over the Bering Sea.

=== Typhoon Rananim (Karen) ===
- Typhoon (JMA)
- Category 2 typhoon (SSHWS)
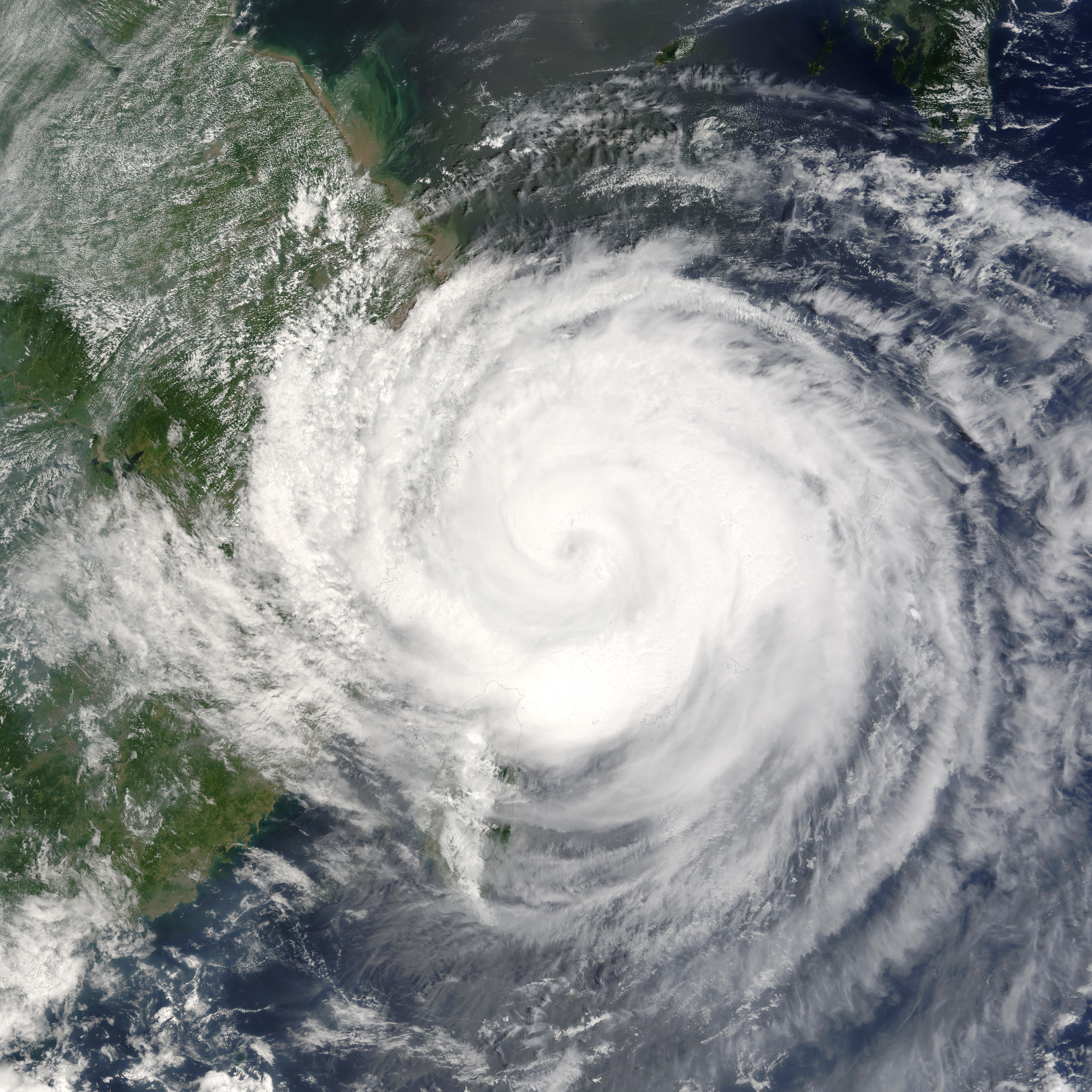
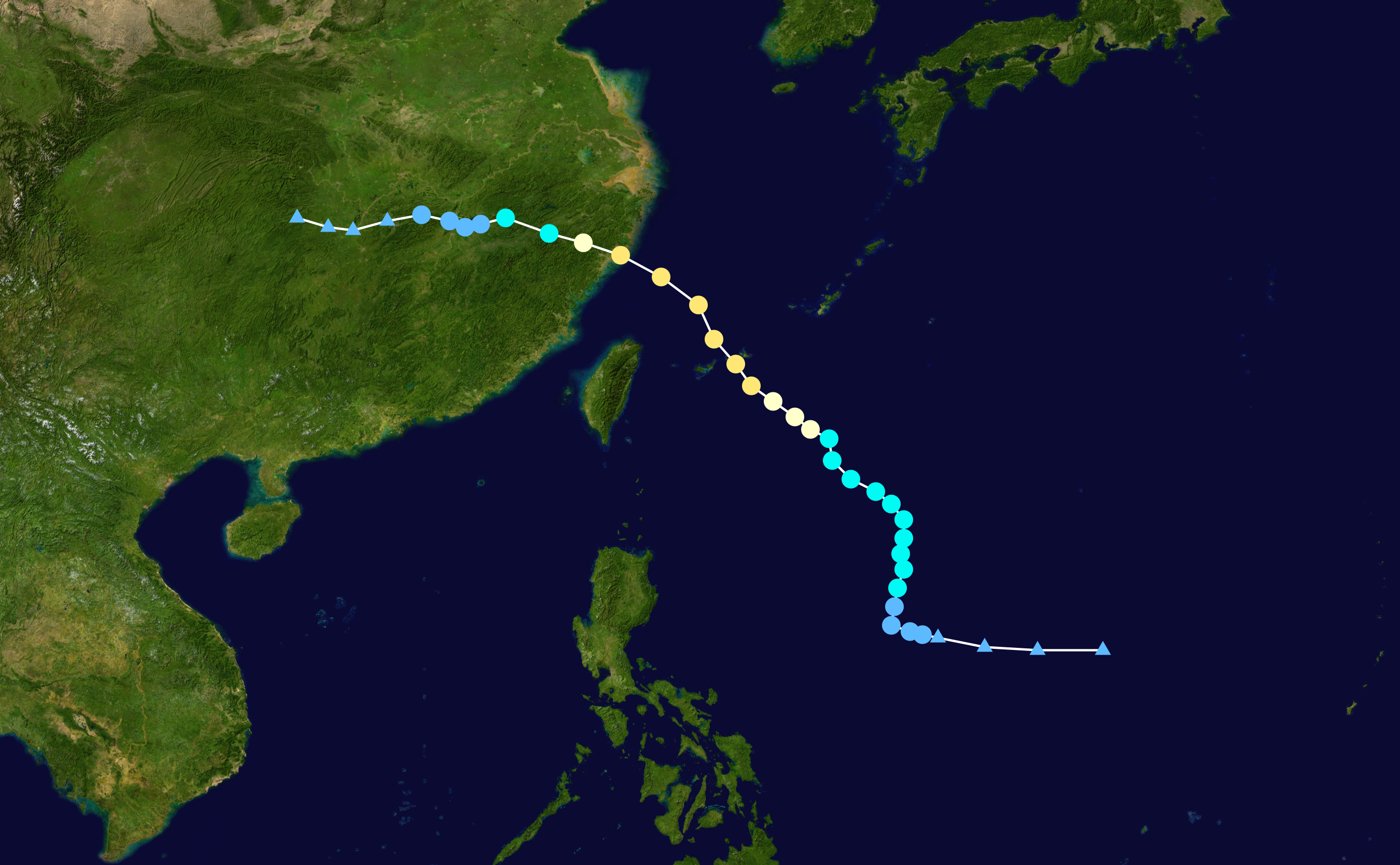
- Duration: August 6 – August 15
- Peak intensity: 150 km/h (90 mph) (10-min); 950 hPa (mbar)

On August 5, the JTWC began monitoring a persistent area of convection to the north-northwest of Guam; accompanied by a low-pressure system, the disturbance developed into a tropical depression the following day. Tracking in a general north-northwest direction, the depression struggled to maintain convection over its center due to wind shear. By August 10, the system intensified into a typhoon, as its outflow became better defined. The following day, a ragged eye began to develop, fueling further strengthening. Rananim reached its peak intensity on August 11 with winds of 150 km/h (93 mph); the JTWC estimated the system to be slightly stronger, peaking with winds of 165 km/h (103 mph). As the storm neared landfall, it began to weaken eventually crossing the Chinese coastline near Wenling, Zhejiang Province with winds of 110 km/h (68 mph). Rapid weakening ensued as the system moved inland; Rananim eventually dissipated near central China on August 15.

Throughout eastern China, Rananim produced torrential rainfall, peaking at 703.5 mm (27.70 in) in Zhejiang, marking a new daily record rainfall in the province. Wind gusts were recorded up to a local record of 211 km/h (131 mph). A total of 188 people were killed by the storm, mostly due to collapsed homes and landslides; roughly 1,800 were injured and over 18 million were affected by Rananim. Economic losses in China amounted to about $2.2 billion (USD). Due to the severity of damage wrought by the storm, the name Rananim was retired the following year.

=== Tropical Storm Malakas ===
- Tropical storm (JMA)
- Tropical storm (SSHWS)
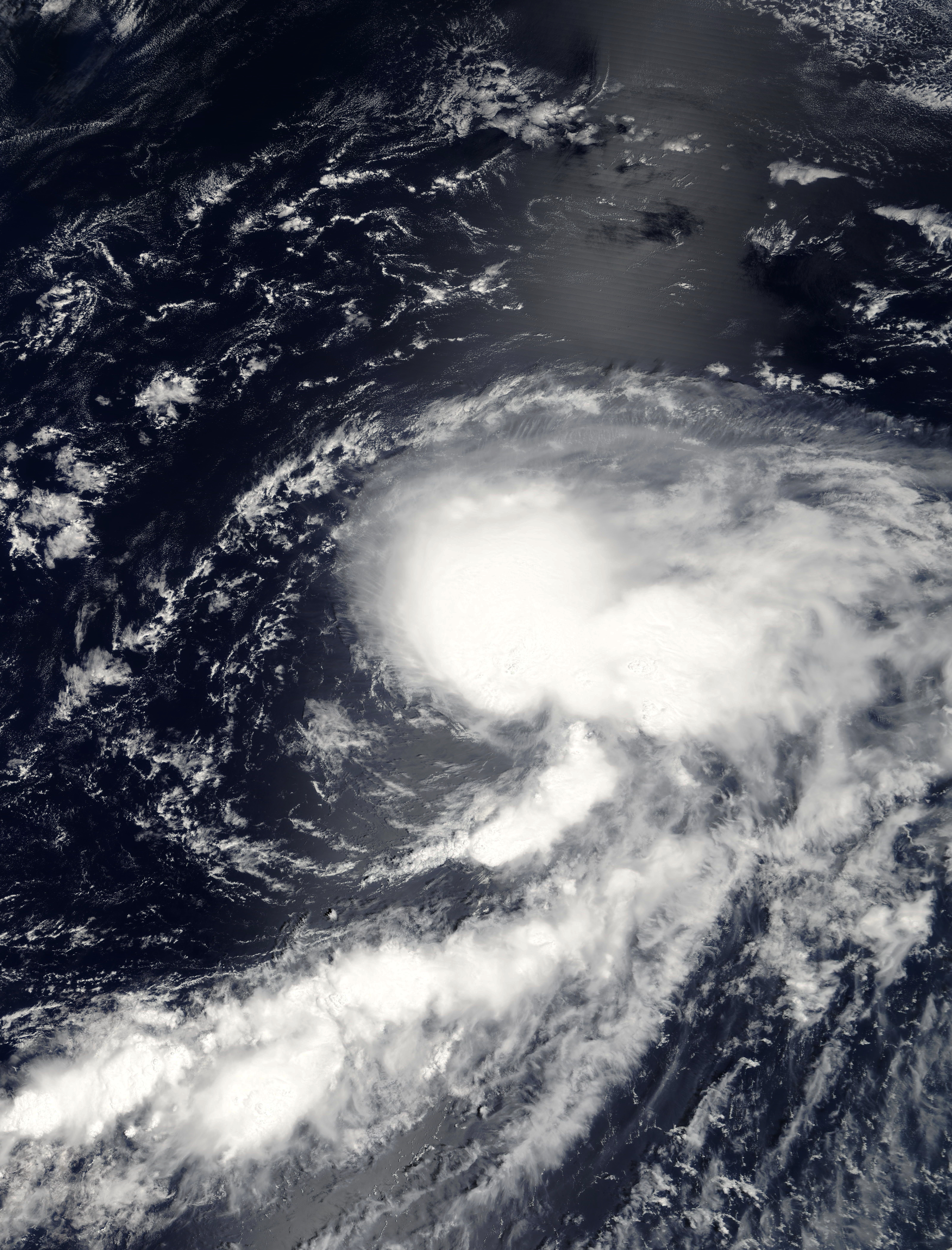
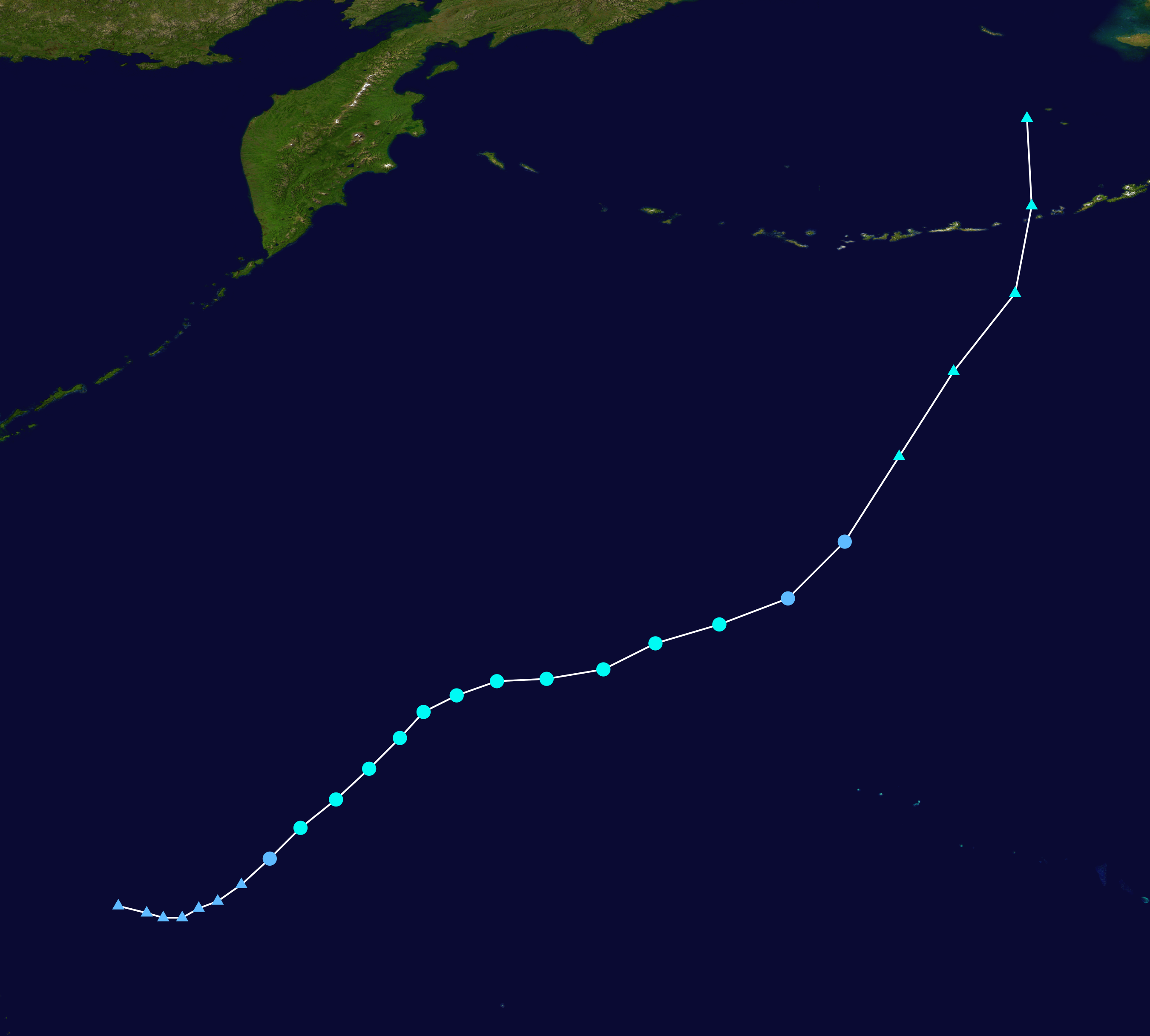
- Duration: August 9 – August 13 (Exited basin)
- Peak intensity: 85 km/h (50 mph) (10-min); 990 hPa (mbar)

A reverse-oriented monsoon trough extended from the Philippine Sea northeastward for hundreds of miles spawned a disturbed area around 22N/150E late on August 8. A weak tropical depression formed out of this area late on August 9. Deep convection was in a cycling mode, and satellite imagery initially indicated that the system was subtropical in nature. The depression was upgraded to Tropical Storm Malakas as it took on a more tropical appearance about 670 miles west-northwest of Wake Island, and it moved northeastward along the northern periphery of the subtropical ridge. By August 12, satellite imagery indicated that Malakas was becoming extratropical. JMA declared the system extratropical on the August 14, placing the weak 25 kn/30 mph low approximately 575 miles north-northwest of Midway Island. Malakas is a Filipino word meaning 'strong' or 'powerful'.

=== Typhoon Megi (Lawin) ===
- Typhoon (JMA)
- Category 1 typhoon (SSHWS)
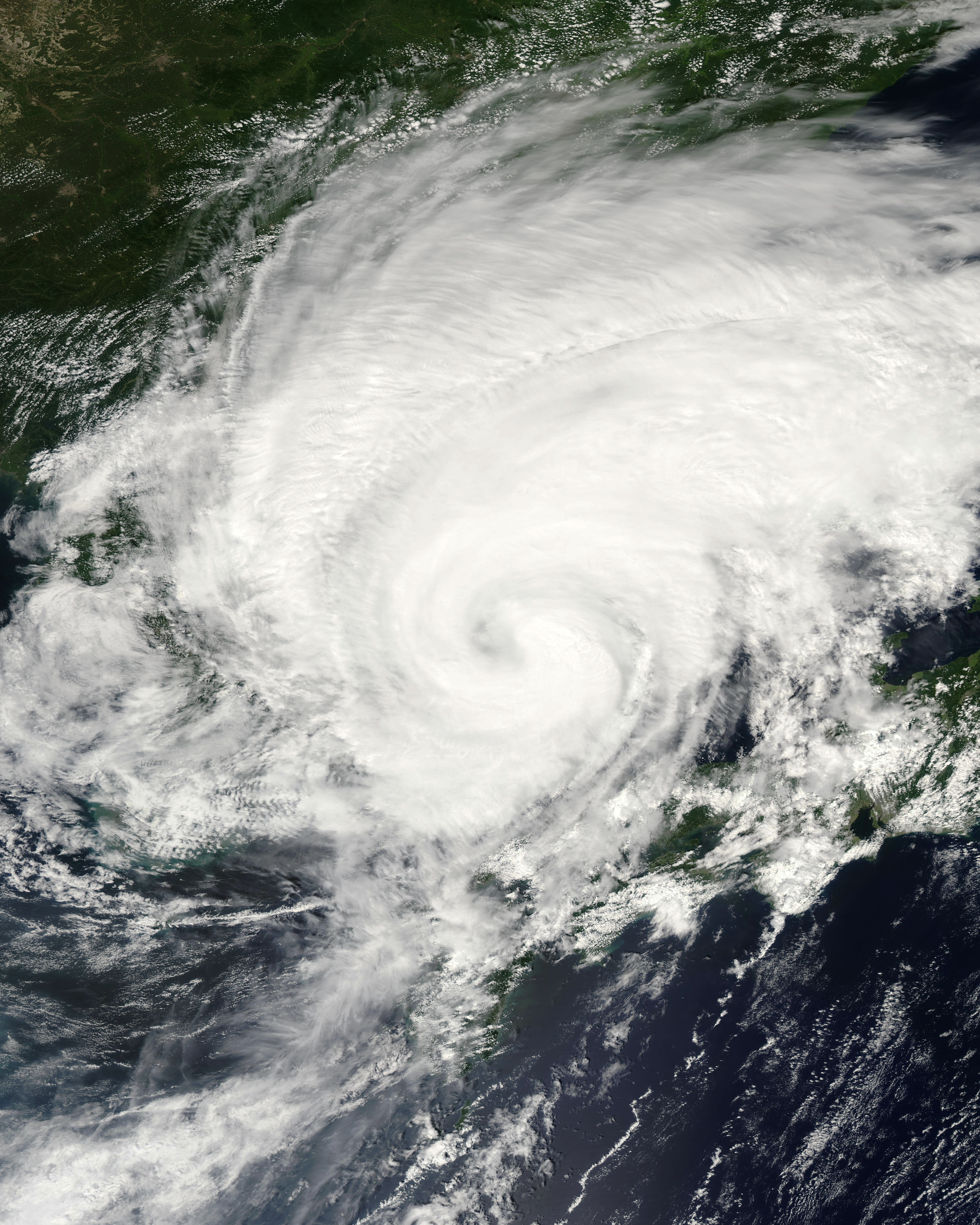
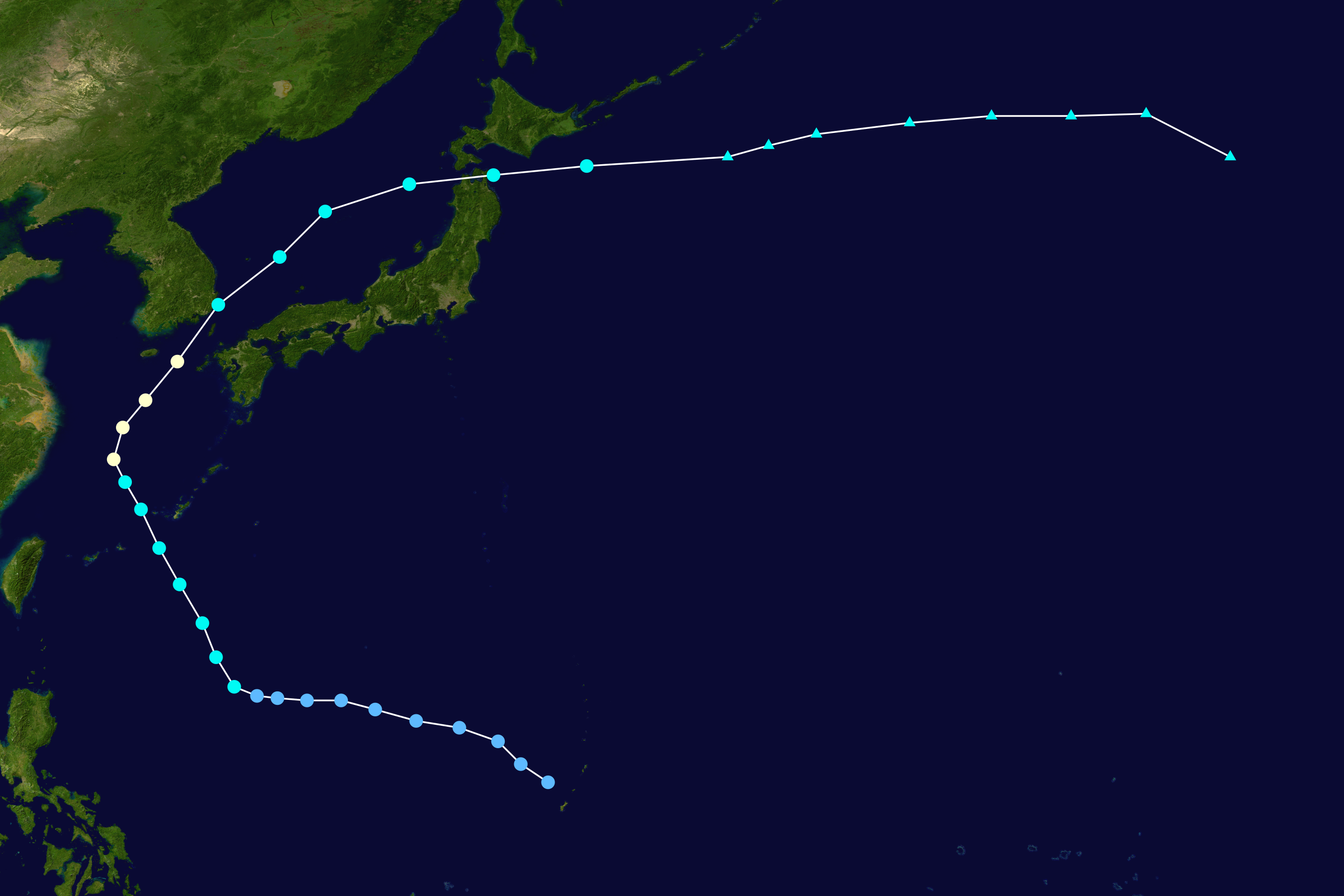
- Duration: August 14 – August 20
- Peak intensity: 120 km/h (75 mph) (10-min); 970 hPa (mbar)

Typhoon Megi was the fourth of eight significant tropical cyclones to form during August. Megi was initially spotted 260 miles west of Guam on August 11, slowly developing into Tropical Depression 18W on the August 14, strengthening into a tropical storm on the August 16, and ultimately into a typhoon on the August 18 to the southwest of Japan. Megi moved northwest through the Ryūkyū Islands before recurving northeastward towards South Korea and Japan. Megi sped across northern Honshū before completing its transition into a nontropical low off the east coast of Hokkaidō. The resultant ocean cyclone moved rapidly eastward, reaching a point near 42N/174E late on the August 22.

Despite peaking at only minimal typhoon intensity, Megi had a significant impact on both Japan and South Korea. In Japan, the highest storm total rainfall noted was 610 mm at Tomisato between August 17 and 21, with 398 mm falling in a 24‑hour period. The highest wind gust was 109 mph/48.7 m/s at Izuhara, Nagasaki early on the August 19. The lowest measured pressure was 974.1 mbar at Izuhara. In South Korea, the heaviest 24‑hour rain total was 332.5 mm at Wando between late on the August 17 and 18. News reports indicated that five people were reported dead or missing after Typhoon Megi in South Korea. The number left homeless rose to more than 2400. Typhoon Megi left at least ten dead in Japan. Megi's landfall on northern Japan resulted in large blackouts as 130,000 homes were left in the dark. A group of about 165 primary school students were stranded by a Megi-induced landslide in western Japan, though were successfully rescued by helicopter. Megi is the Korean word for the catfish.

=== Typhoon Chaba ===
- Violent typhoon (JMA)
- Category 5 super typhoon (SSHWS)
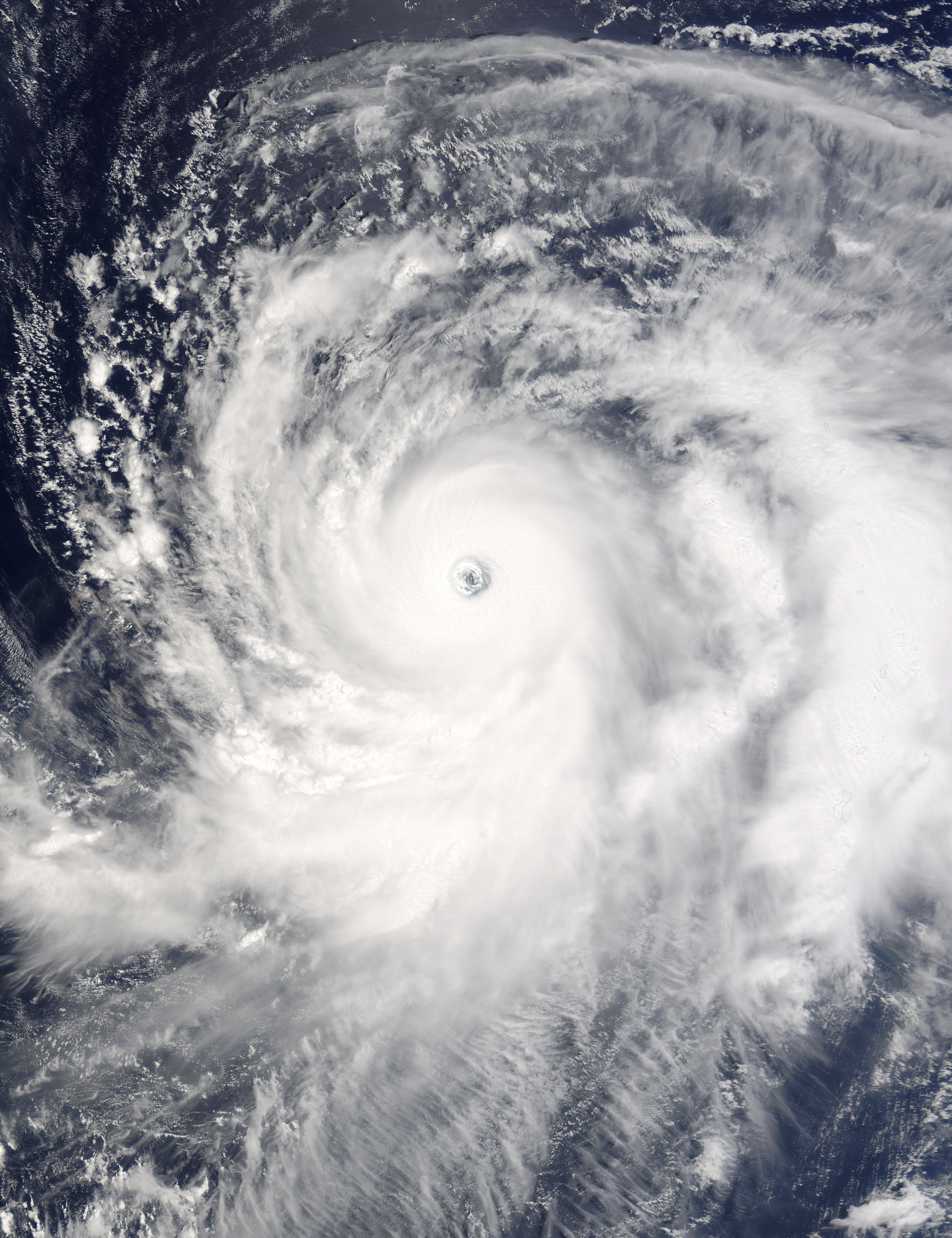
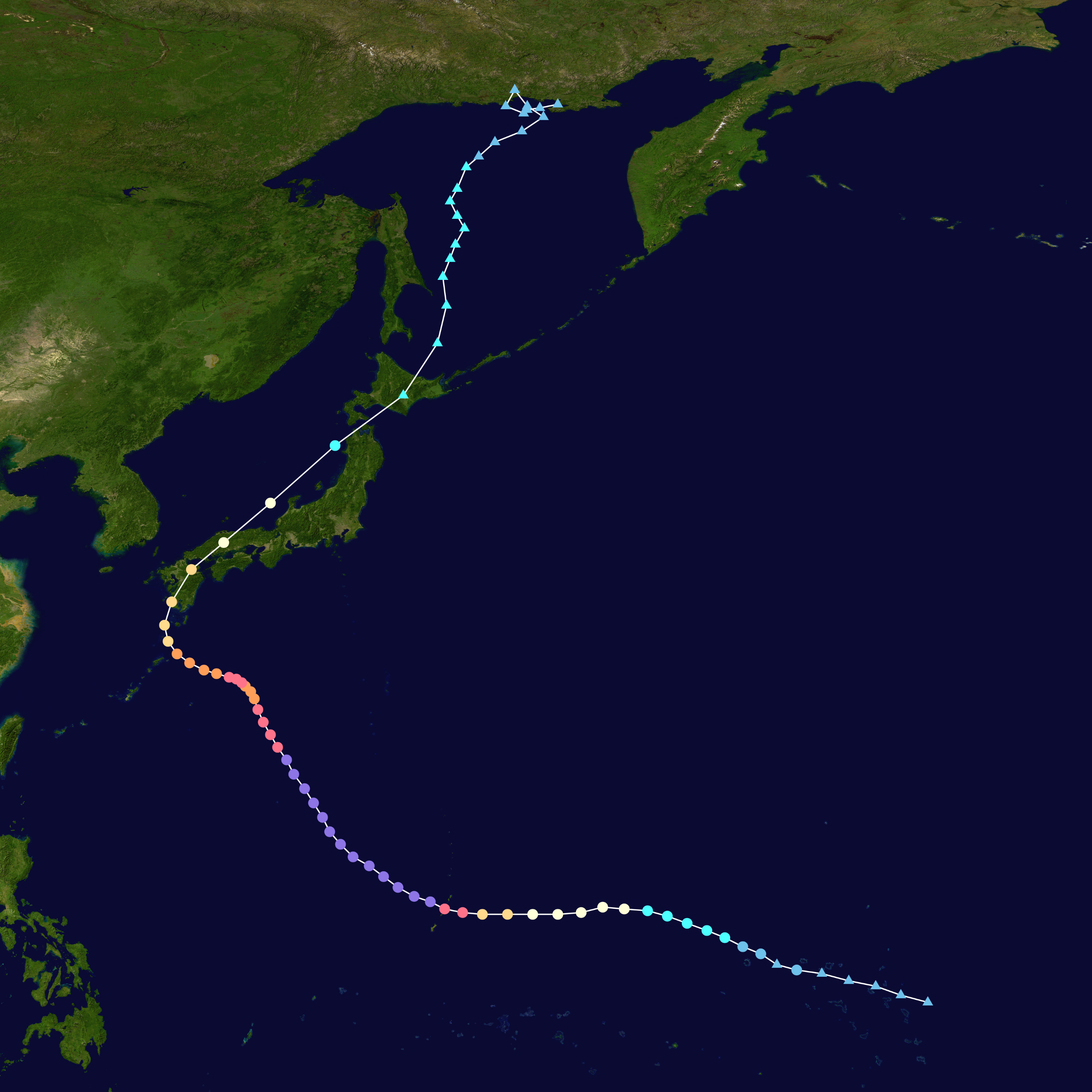
- Duration: August 18 – August 31
- Peak intensity: 205 km/h (125 mph) (10-min); 910 hPa (mbar)

Chaba formed on August 18 in the open Western Pacific. It moved westward, strengthening into a tropical storm on August 19 and a typhoon on August 20. Chaba turned to the northwest, and rapidly intensified to a 155 kn/180 mph super typhoon on the August 22 with an estimated minimum central pressure of 910 mbar, becoming the strongest typhoon of the year. After fluctuating between 100 kn/115 mph and super typhoon status for several days, Chaba weakened as it turned to the north, and hit the southwestern Japanese island of Honshū. It accelerated to the northeast, and became extratropical on August 31. The storm killed seven people and caused $2 billion in damages. The name "Chaba" was submitted by Cambodia and refers to the Chinese hibiscus.

=== Typhoon Aere (Marce) ===
- Typhoon (JMA)
- Category 2 typhoon (SSHWS)
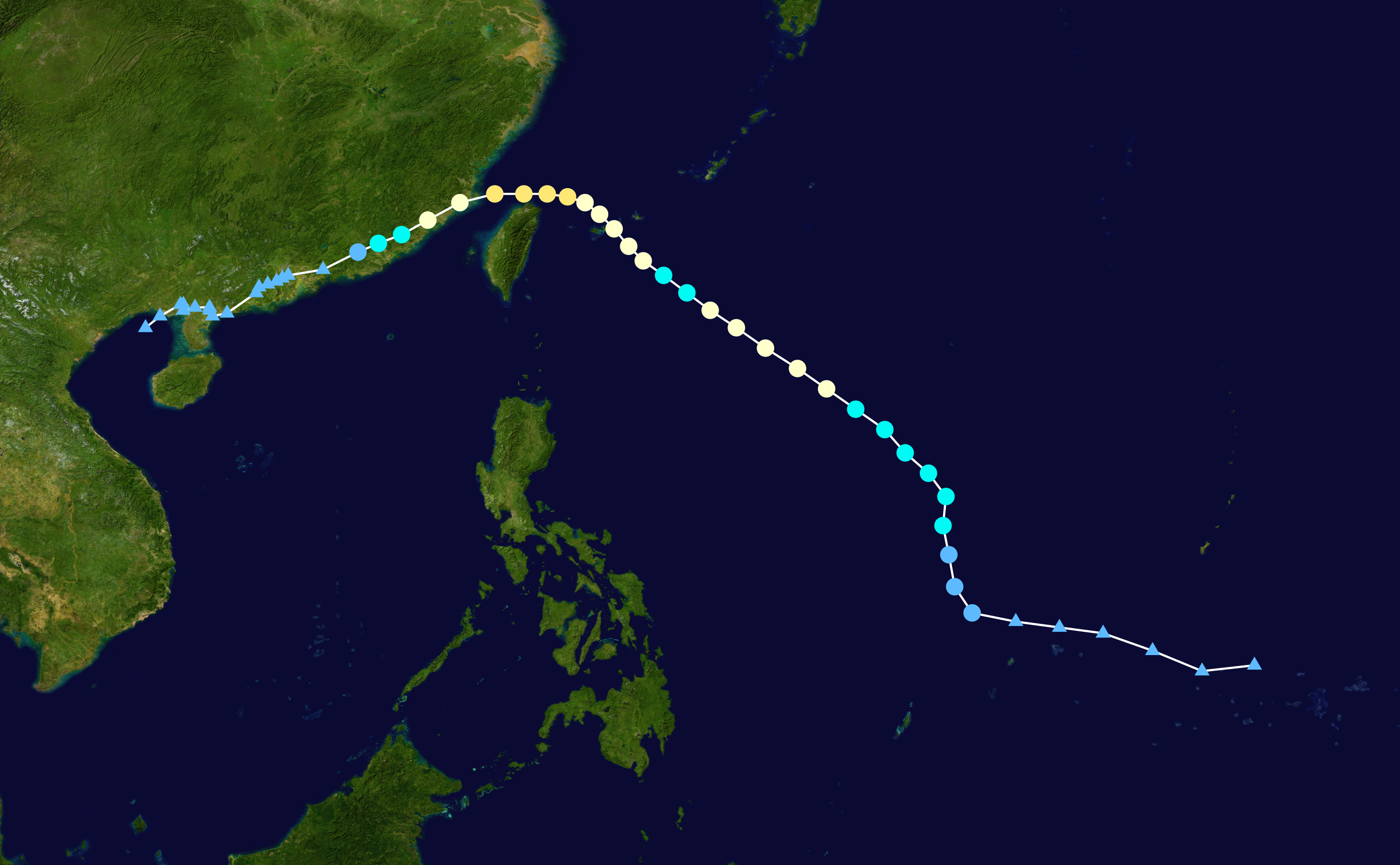
- Duration: August 18 – August 31
- Peak intensity: 150 km/h (90 mph) (10-min); 955 hPa (mbar)

Aere is the Marshallese word for 'storm'. A tropical disturbance developed into a tropical depression on the 19th about 400 miles west of Guam, and moved northwest at 10 kn/12 mph along the southwestern periphery of a mid-level steering ridge. The system reached tropical storm status on the 20th, gaining the name Aere. Aere subsequently crossed into the Philippine's area of responsibility and was assigned the name Marce. Aere was upgraded to typhoon intensity on the 21st, and its strength leveled off during the 21st and 22nd. On the 23rd, Typhoon Aere was downgraded to a tropical storm briefly due to vertical wind shear while located 200 miles south of Naha, Okinawa. Aere quickly regained typhoon strength and maintained intensity for the rest of the 23rd and developed a 50-mile wide eye. Aere reached its peak intensity of 85 kn/100 mph late on the 24th, when the pressure lowered to 955 mb. As the storm crossed the northern tip of Taiwan it began to weaken. Aere turned southwestward later that day, a trajectory that carried the storm past Xiamen early on the 26th and close to Shantou later that day before weakening into a tropical storm. The remnants of Typhoon Aere remained a tropical depression until the 31st.

Early on the 25th, six villages located in Gaoqiao Town, Yinzhou District, Ningbo City, were struck by a tornado triggered by Typhoon Aere. The tornado did cause some economic losses, but no casualties were reported. Preliminary statistics indicated that the typhoon had caused 2.485 billion yuan of direct economic losses and was responsible for two deaths in Fujian Province. Aere also affected 3,479,900 residents in 421 towns of 48 counties of 6 cities in Fujian, where three cities were flooded, 10,100 houses were toppled, 236 embankments and thousands of water conservancy facilities were damaged. Thirty-four people were killed in Taiwan as a result of the storm, and fifteen died as a mudslide buried a remote mountain village in the north of the island. Agricultural losses were estimated at 7.7 million New Taiwan dollars ($313,000 USD). Forty-three deaths in the Philippines were caused by heavy rains induced by the typhoon. Eight provinces in northern and central Luzon were most severely affected with 70% of the provinces under water at one point.

=== Typhoon Songda (Nina) ===
- Very strong typhoon (JMA)
- Category 4 typhoon (SSHWS)
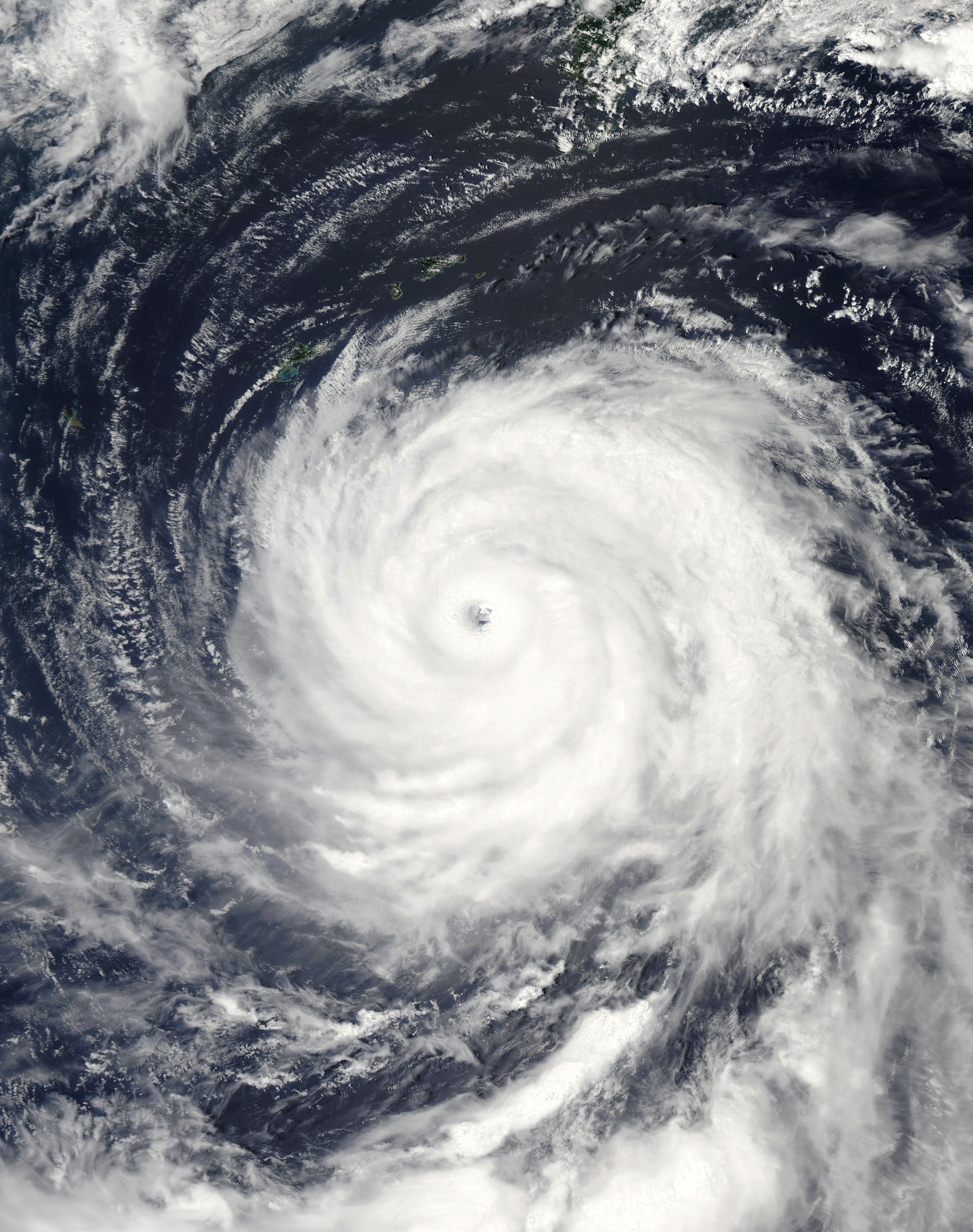
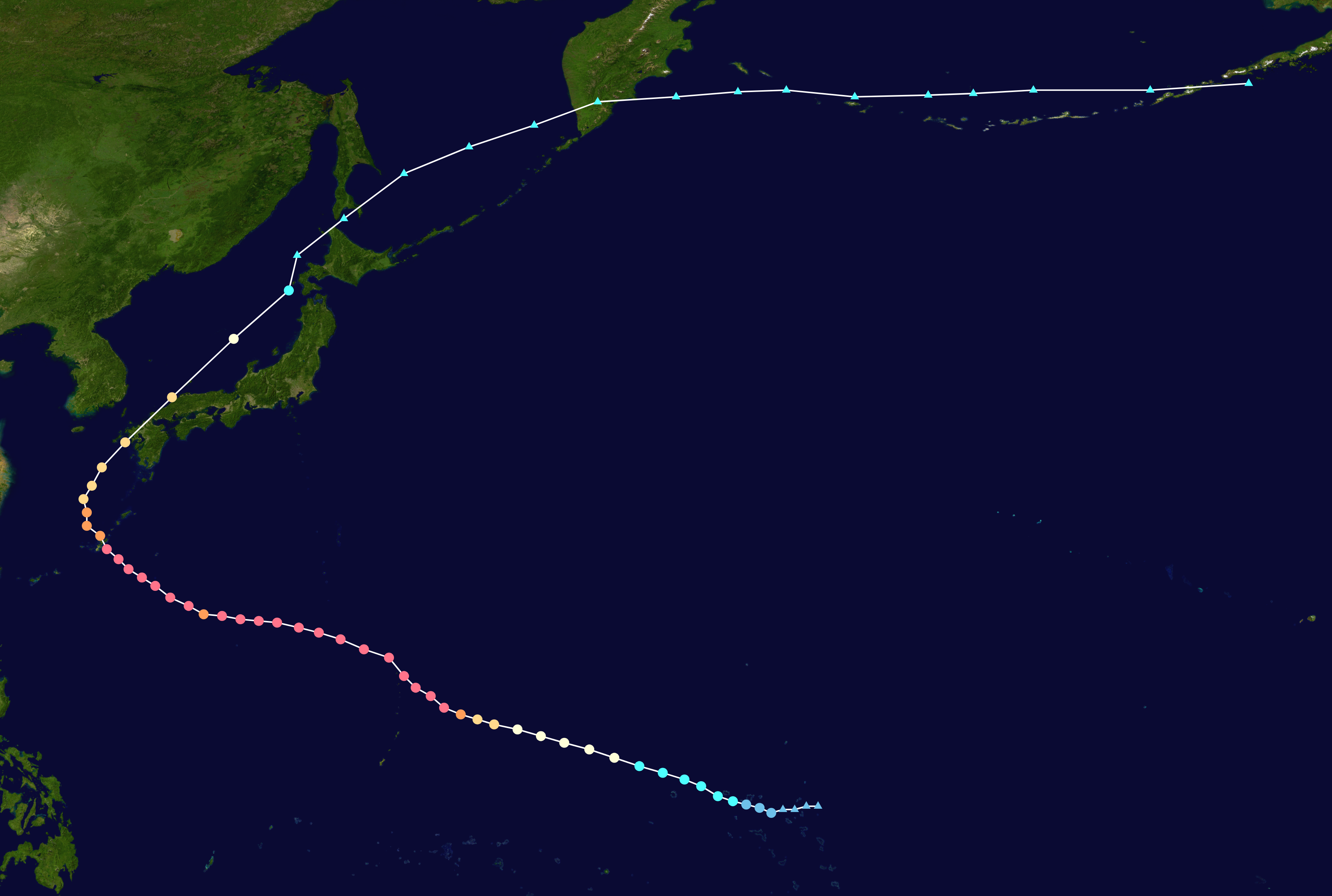
- Duration: August 26 – September 8
- Peak intensity: 175 km/h (110 mph) (10-min); 925 hPa (mbar)

On August 26, a new area low-pressure system developed roughly 390 km (240 mi) northeast of Kwajalein. Shortly thereafter, the JMA began monitoring the system as a tropical depression. Light wind shear and favorable diffluence allowed the system to strengthen, prompting the JTWC to issue their first advisory on Tropical Depression 22W the next day. By the morning of August 28, both agencies had upgraded the system to a tropical storm, with the JMA assigning it the name Songda, a branch of the Red River in northern Vietnam. By August 30, the system had intensified into a minimal typhoon. By the following day, the storm had undergone rapid intensification to attain its peak ten-minute sustained and one-minute sustained winds of 175 and 230 km/h (109 and 143 mph) according to the JMA and JTWC respectively.

Over the following days, the powerful storm fluctuated in intensity, during which time it passed through the Northern Mariana Islands. On September 3, the storm briefly entered PAGASA's area of responsibility and was given the local name Nina. Early on September 5, Songda brushed the northern coast of Okinawa Island, where a barometric pressure of 925 mbar (hPa; 27.32 inHg) was recorded. Curving towards the northeast, the storm gradually weakened and made landfall near Nagasaki, Japan as a strong typhoon. Accelerating towards the northeast, the system quickly weakened to a tropical storm by the evening on September 7 before transitioning into an extratropical cyclone shortly thereafter. The remnants of Songda were monitored by the JMA until late on September 10, at which time they crossed the International Date Line near the Aleutian Islands.

Throughout Songda's track, several islands were affected; Enewetak Atoll recorded tropical storm-force winds with gusts up to 120 km/h (75 mph) during the storm's passage. In the Mariana Islands, Agrihan sustained widespread damage, with all crops and structures considered a total loss, leaving $500,000 in monetary losses. Throughout Japan, Songda caused catastrophic damage and significant loss of life, mainly due to rain-related events. The heaviest rains fell in Miyazaki Prefecture, where a station measured 905 mm (35.6 in) during Songda's passage. Losses from the storm reached $9 billion, ranking it as the costliest storm to ever strike the country and one of the most destructive in the western Pacific. Forty-one people were killed by the storm, mainly in Kyūshū.

=== Severe Tropical Storm Sarika ===
- Severe tropical storm (JMA)
- Tropical storm (SSHWS)
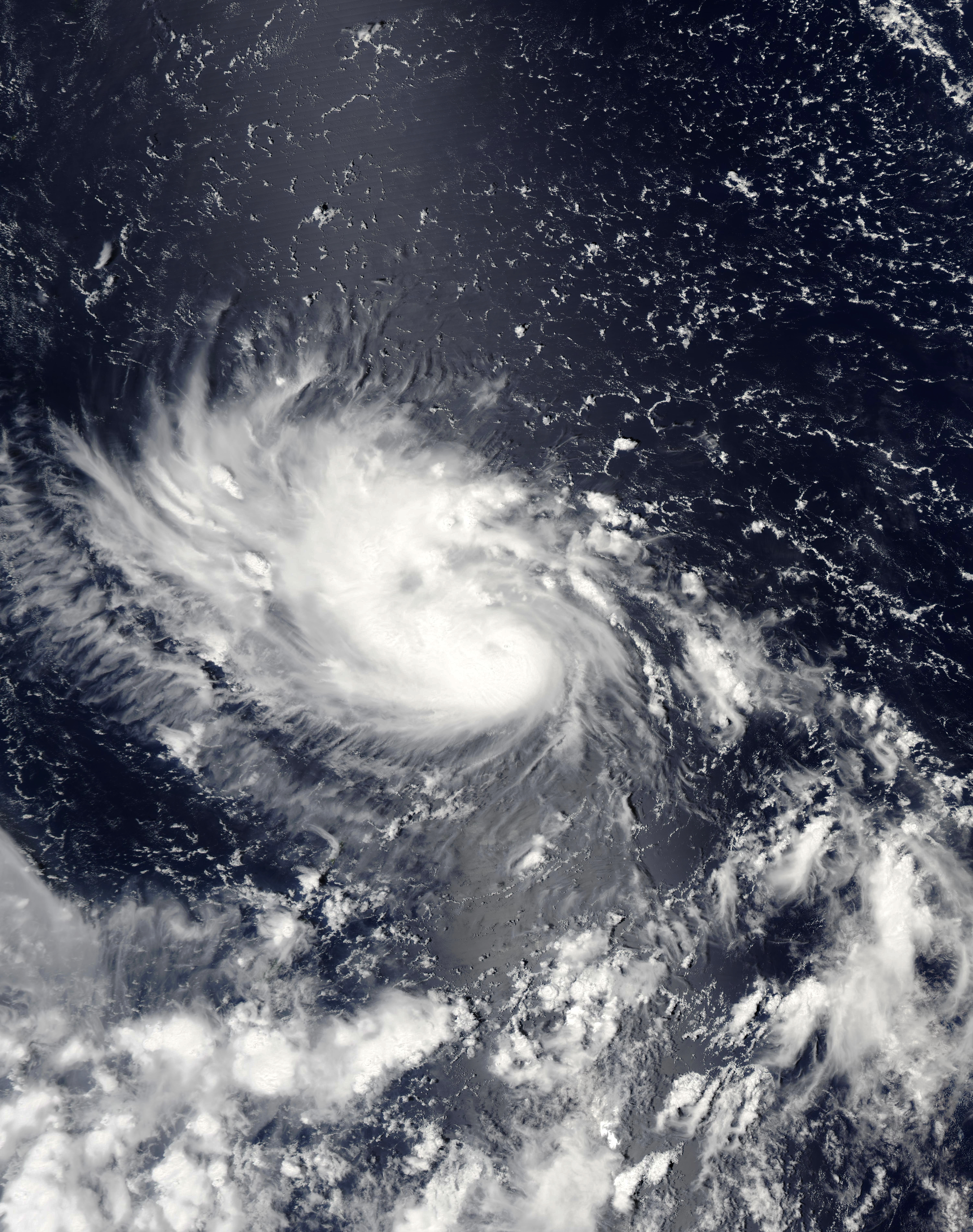
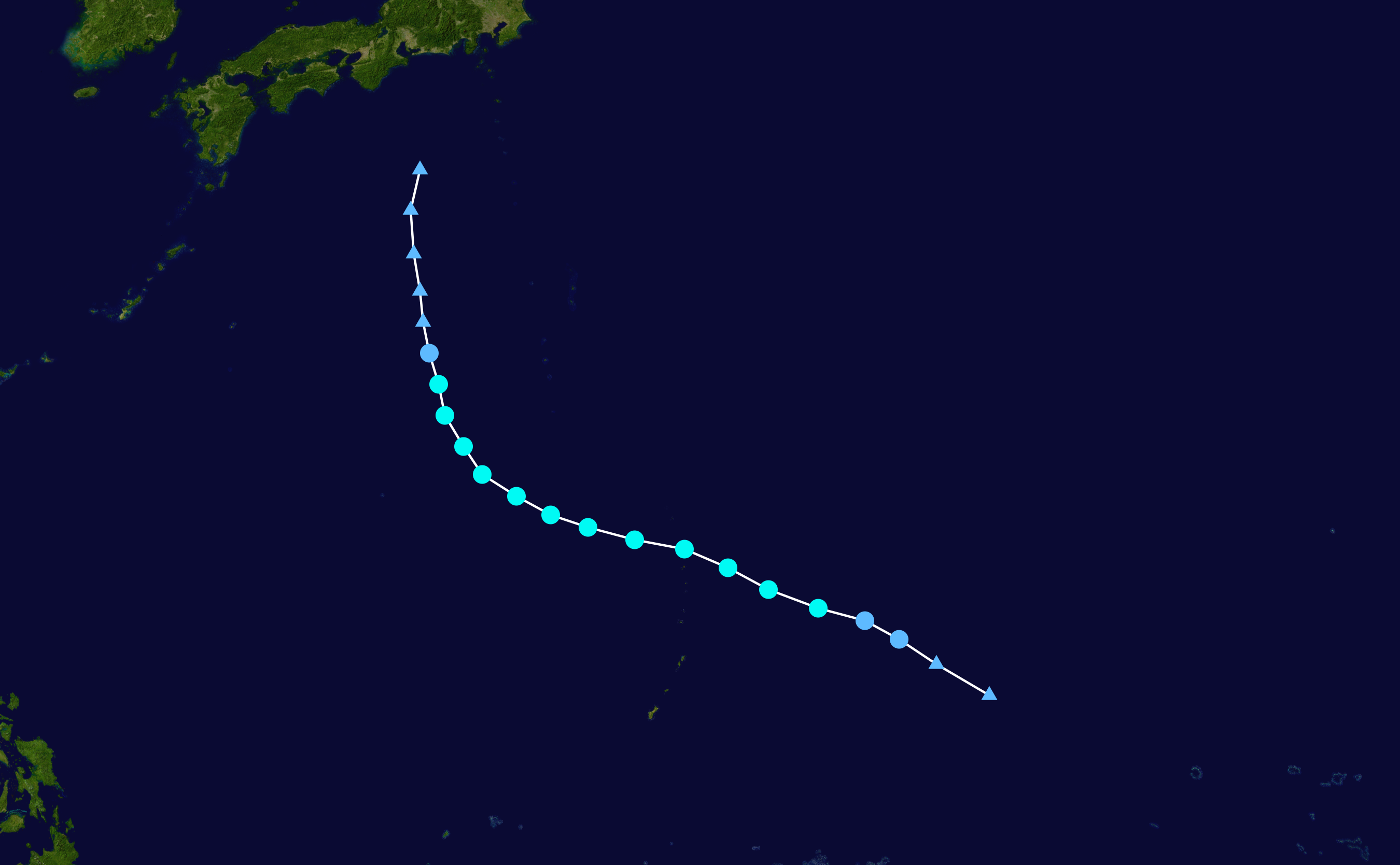
- Duration: September 3 – September 9
- Peak intensity: 100 km/h (65 mph) (10-min); 980 hPa (mbar)

The name Sarika is originally from a songbird found in Cambodia. JMA classified a tropical depression early on September 4. By the 5th, a typhoon warning was issued for the island of Agrihan. Moving west-northwest along the southern periphery of the subtropical ridge, Tropical Depression 23W was upgraded to Tropical Storm Sarika that day. An upper-level low located to the southeast was providing an efficient eastern outflow channel in addition to the decent equatorial outflow. Rapid intensification ensued for a while with the maximum sustained winds rising to 60 kn/70 mph late on the 5th, which was the peak intensity for Sarika. By the 6th, Tropical Storm Sarika passed 220 miles north of Saipan. Shortly afterward, the system's center made its closest approach to Agrihan, tracking 10 miles south of that island. Near-typhoon conditions occurred on both Agrihan and Pagan while tropical storm-force winds were experienced on Alamagan. At its peak Sarika, possessed a very compact wind field with gales extending no further than 90 miles from the center while the radius of strongest winds never exceeded 15 miles. By the 6th, Sarika had turned westward 100 miles west of Agrihan. Early on the 7th, Sarika began to weaken as it entered a hostile shearing environment associated with Typhoon Songda's outflow. Sarika subsequently turned to the north-northwest at 9 mph/8 kn about 820 miles south of Tokyo, Japan while becoming fully exposed. It slowed as it turned northward late on the 7th. The system remained a tropical storm until the 8th when Sarika weakened back into a depression.

=== Tropical Storm Haima (Ofel) ===
- Tropical storm (JMA)
- Subtropical storm (SSHWS)
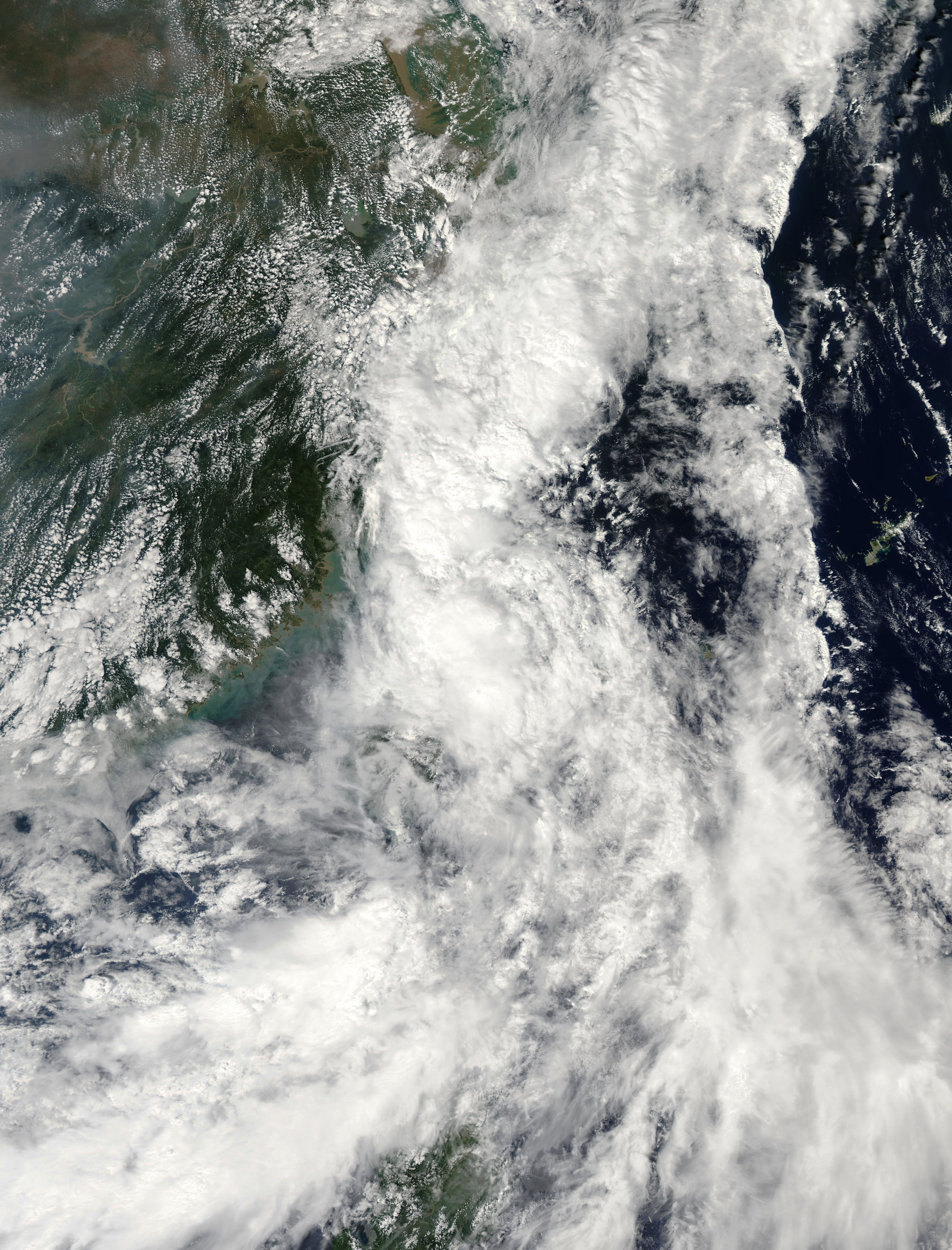
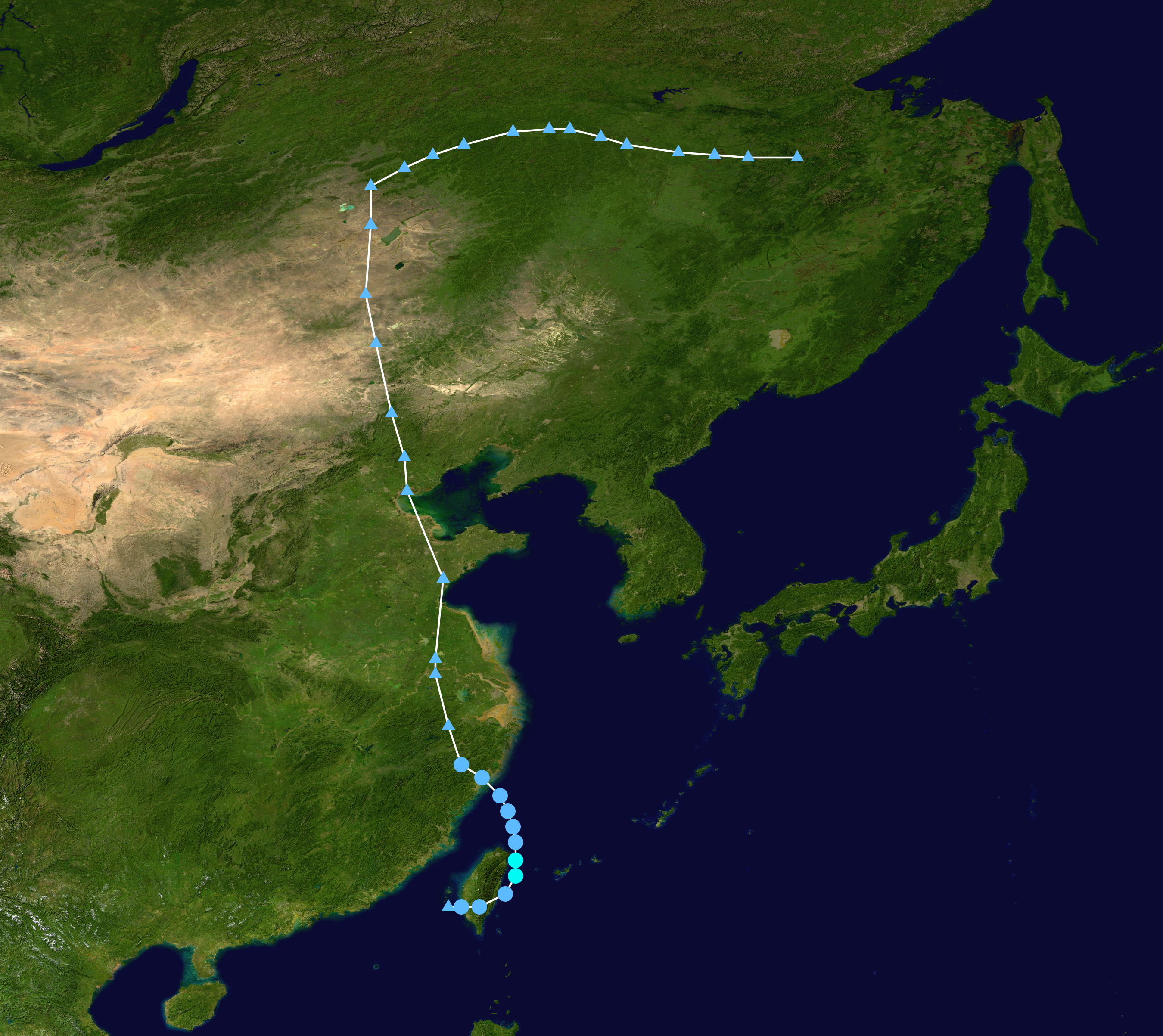
- Duration: September 10 – September 13
- Peak intensity: 75 km/h (45 mph) (10-min); 995 hPa (mbar)

Haima is the Chinese word for the sea horse. Early on September 11, an area of thunderstorms was observed 150 nmi southwest of Taipei, Taiwan. Later that day, the newly formed tropical depression saw its thunderstorms track across Taiwan, leaving the circulation center behind east of the mountainous isle as it took on a subtropical appearance. The next day, it had strengthened into a tropical storm and was named Haima by the JMA and Ofel by the PAGASA. The JTWC considered the system a tropical depression or subtropical storm, but never a tropical storm. The center track just east of Taiwan on September 12, towards the southeast coast of China. Haima made landfall south of Shanghai on September 13 before turning to the northwest. Haima soon become a completely sheared system due to interaction with the upper-level winds over a frontal zone located to its west, and was declared dissipated the next day.

In China, the lowest reported pressure was 998 mb in Yongqiang Town on the 13th and the highest 24‑hour rainfall recorded was 250.8 mm in Fuzhou City between September 9 and 10, which set a new September daily rainfall record for the station. In Taiwan, daily rainfall ranged as high as 393 mm in Taipei county, and 611.5 mm in Taipei City. The highest wind gust reported was 80 mph/35.9 m/s at Lanyu on the 11th. The storm damaged 78 square kilometres of farmland in Zhejiang Province, China, where direct economic losses were estimated to have been over 53 million yuan. Torrential rains (Sep 7–10), including those in the monsoonal flow around the pre-Haima depression had caused 54.6 million yuan of direct economic losses in Pingtan County and Changle City. In Japan, rainfall and winds were relatively light. In South Korea, the highest 24‑hour rainfall report noted was 104.5 mm at Wando between the 11th and 12th.

=== Typhoon Meari (Quinta) ===
- Very strong typhoon (JMA)
- Category 4 typhoon (SSHWS)
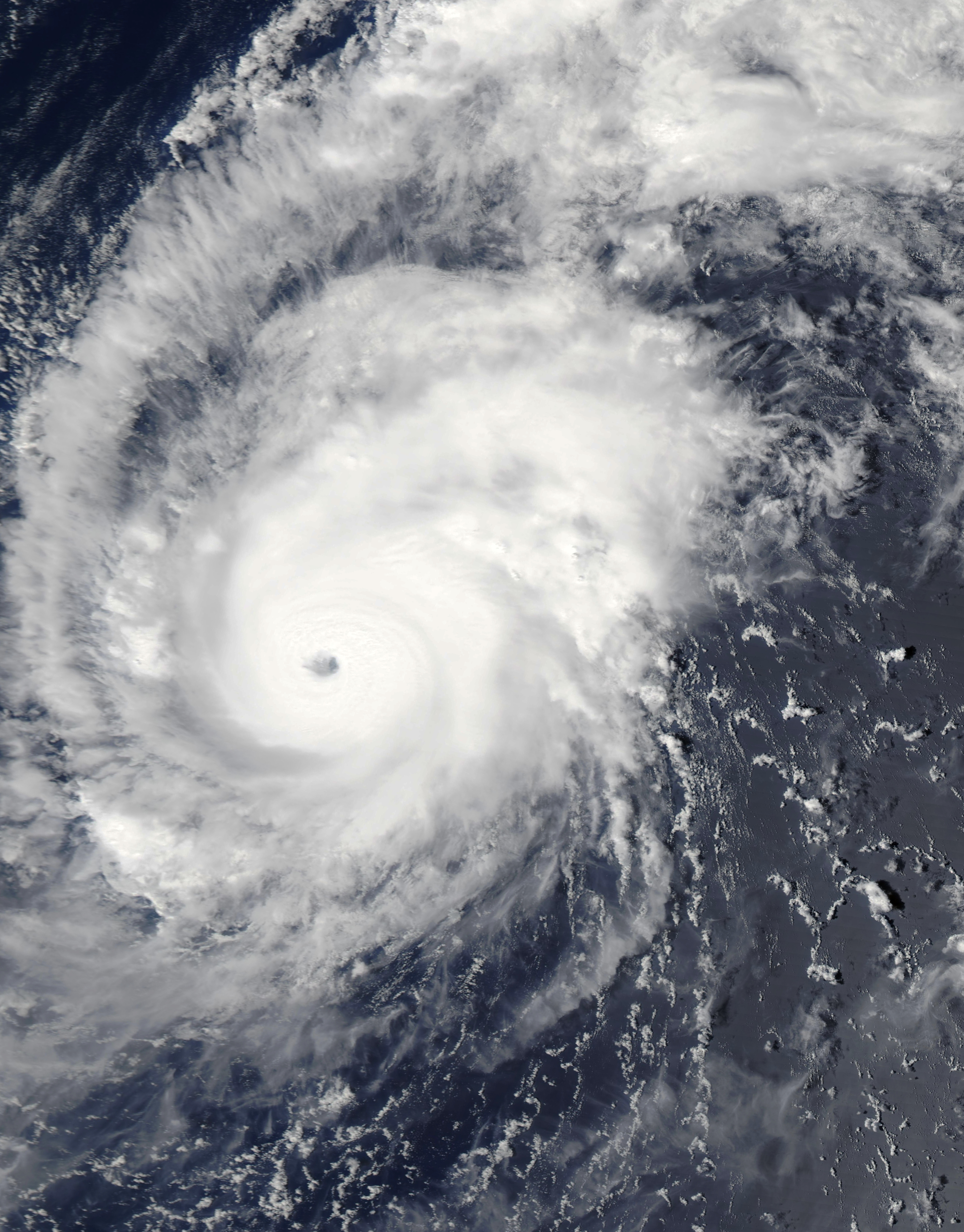
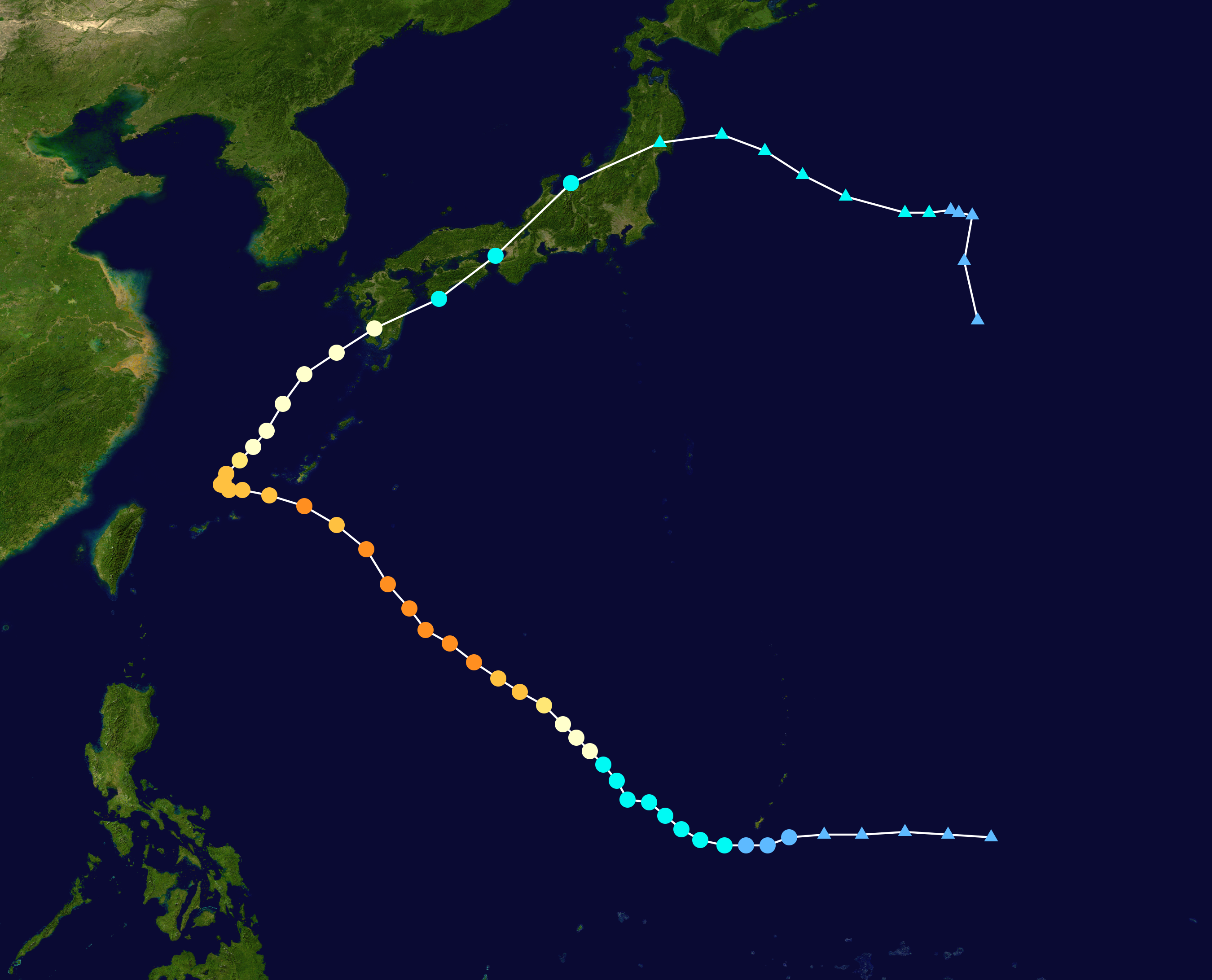
- Duration: September 19 – September 29
- Peak intensity: 165 km/h (105 mph) (10-min); 940 hPa (mbar)

Late on September 18, an area of convection was noted 510 miles east of Guam. On the 20th, Tropical Depression 25W organized out of this mass and was located just 35 miles southeast of Guam. 25W turned more westward and began to accelerate as it moved along the southern periphery of a warm-core ridge. On the 21st, the system was upgraded to Tropical Storm Meari. It intensified steadily while moving more northwestward. The system was upgraded to typhoon intensity by late on the 22nd. Typhoon Meari possessed a very asymmetric circulation, elongated somewhat to the north and northeast. Meari became a strong 100-kn/115 mph typhoon by late on the 23rd, and was assigned the name Quinta by PAGASA. After reaching 125 kn/145 mph on the 24th, its strength plateaued for the rest of the day. As it passed 70 miles south of Okinawa early on the 26th, Meari was slowly weakening. The cyclone ceased movement on the 27th about 170 miles west of Okinawa as it became lodged between two anticyclones. A slow northward drift began later that day and vertical wind shear associated with the subtropical jet stream began to take its toll on Meari. By the 29th, Meari was beginning its approach to the Japanese island of Kyūshū. Typhoon Meari made landfall over the southern tip of Kyūshū around midday local time with maximum sustained winds of 70 kn/80 mph. Meari weakened back into a tropical storm late on the 29th. The forward motion began to accelerate as Meari increasingly interacted with the westerlies. The system was followed until the 30th, when it became a nontropical low, which continued tracking eastwards through the north Pacific.

The highest wind gust reported was 118 mph/52.7 m/s in Kagoshima early on the 29th. The lowest pressure measured during the passage of Meari was 975.5 mb, also at Kagoshima on the 29th. Three tornadoes were spawned in Japan, with two touching down in Okinawa Prefecture and one in Aichi Prefecture. The heaviest rains in Japan were saved for Osawe, where 904 mm fell between late on the 24th and the 30th, with 741 mm falling between late on the 28th and 29th. Reports indicate that at least 18 people died with several more reported missing as a result of Typhoon Meari. The worst affected areas were the prefectures of Mie and Ehime in Japan where torrential rains caused widespread flooding and mudslides destroyed several homes. Train and ferry services were suspended, stranding thousands of people. Damages from the storm amounted to $798 million (2004 USD).

=== Typhoon Ma-on (Rolly) ===
- Very strong typhoon (JMA)
- Category 5 super typhoon (SSHWS)
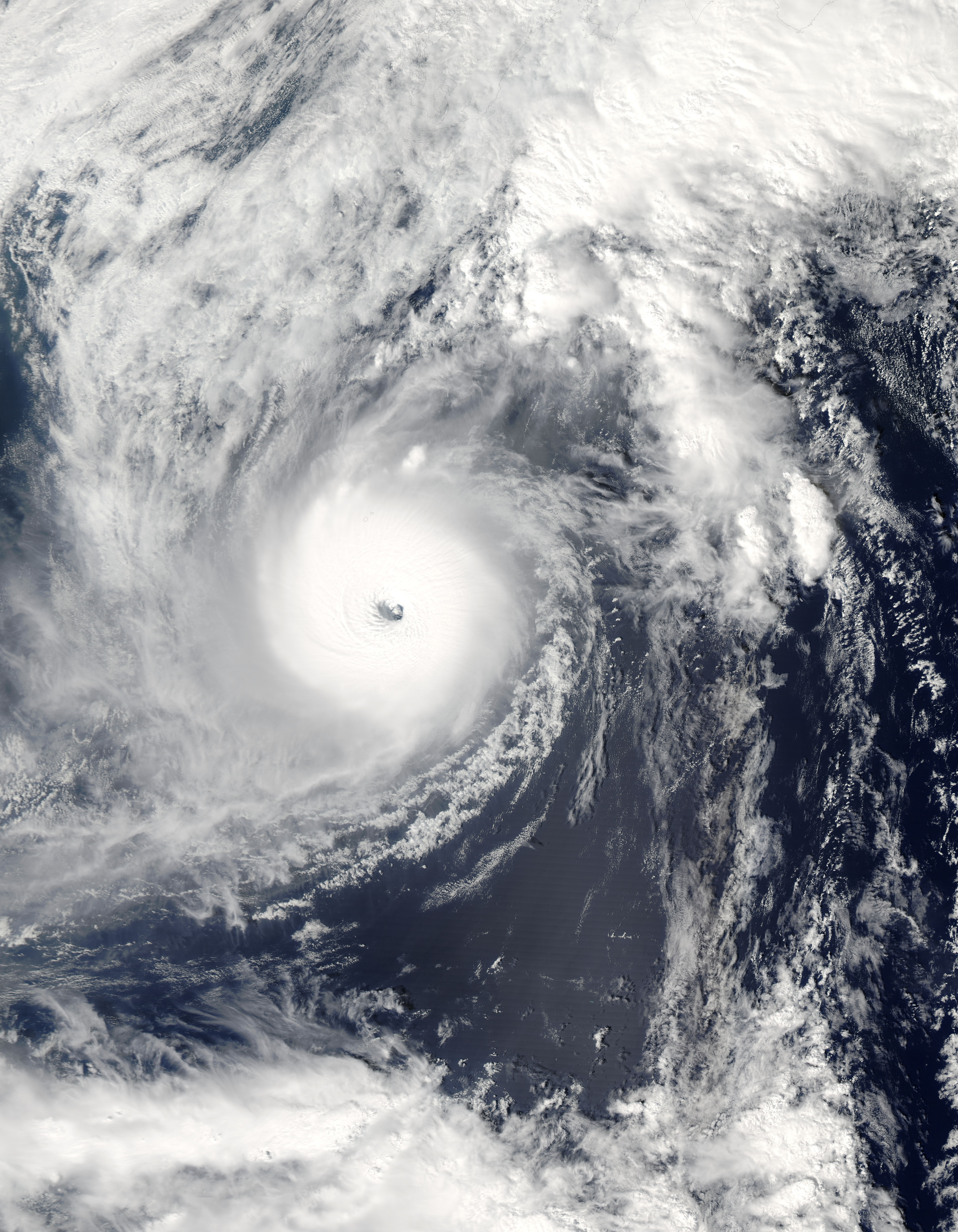
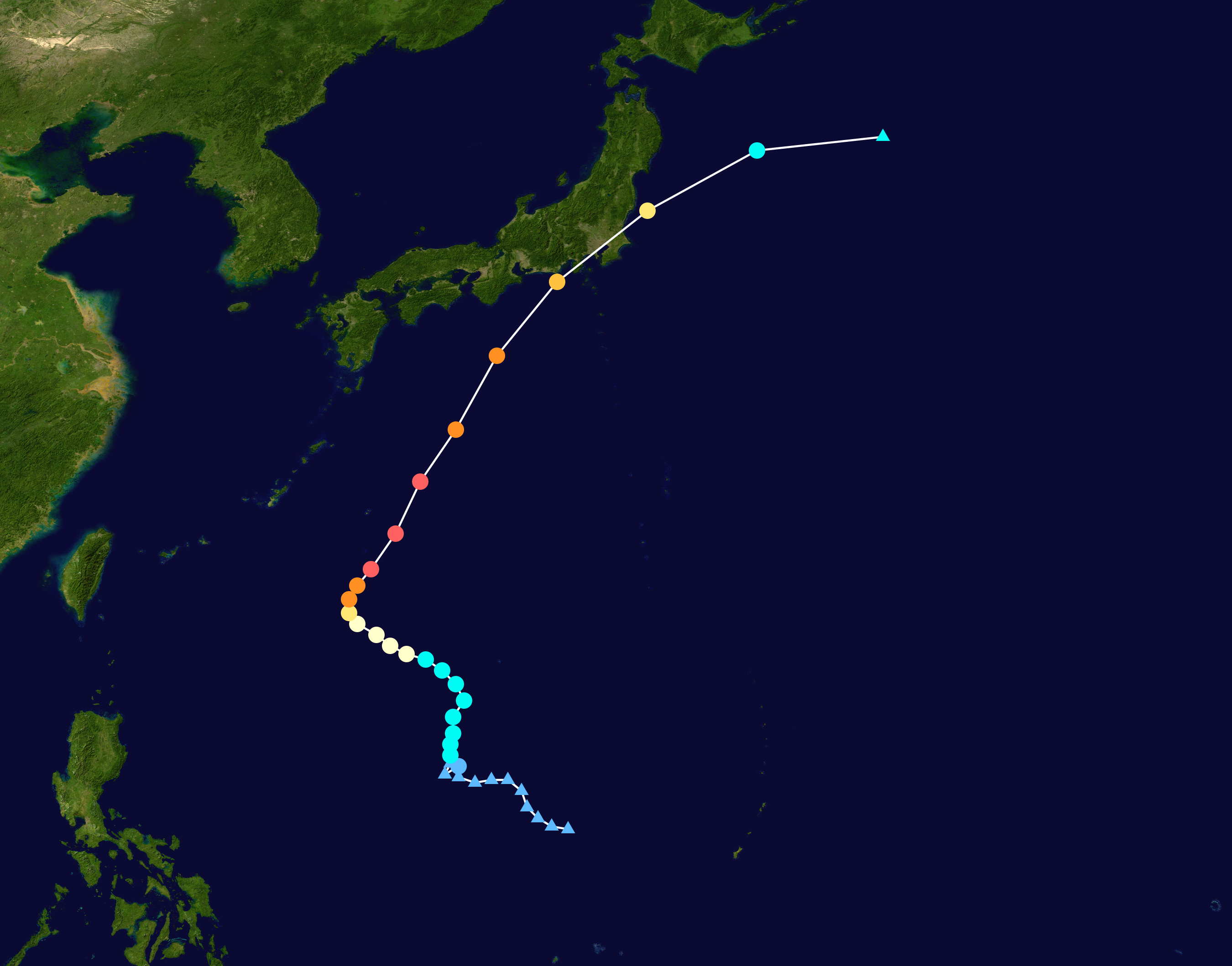
- Duration: October 3 – October 10
- Peak intensity: 185 km/h (115 mph) (10-min); 920 hPa (mbar)

Ma-on formed from a cluster of thunderstorms in the vicinity of Guam on September 29. The small system eventually trekked west-northwesterly. After days of sputtering across the western Pacific, Tropical Depression 26W formed on October 4, and quickly became named Tropical Storm Ma-on. The system became stationary approximately 650 nmi southeast of Okinawa, Japan. PAGASA named the cyclone Rolly when it passed the 135th meridian. On the 5th, a northward drift ensued while well southeast of Okinawa. Upon reaching typhoon intensity late on the 6th, Ma-on turned northwest and ultimately became the sixth super typhoon of the year on the 8th while 250 miles southeast of Okinawa. The typhoon become the worst storm to hit eastern Japan in over ten years, only a week after Typhoon Meari had made landfall in that nation. Ma-on started to accelerate northeastward and its eye began to shrink in diameter and became more ragged. A slow weakening trend materialized as it entered the early stages of extratropical transition. Recurving northeast at a high rate of translation, Ma-on made landfall on the Izu Peninsula, Japan, late on the 9th with maximum sustained winds of 105 kn/120 mph as a Category 3 typhoon. Ma-on weakened rapidly and was downgraded to a tropical storm by the 10th, and quickly completed its transformation into a nontropical low. The remnant system moved more east-northeastward away from eastern Japan before slowing its motion 1100 miles southeast of Hokkaidō.

Ma-on was one of the most powerful storms to strike eastern Japan over the last ten years, along with Faxai. The highest wind gust reported was 151 mph/67.6 m/s in Irōzaki late on the 9th. The lowest pressure was also recorded at Irōzaki; 964 mb late on the 9th. The typhoon left at least six people dead, and three persons were reported missing. Plane, train and ferry services nationwide were disrupted, stranding thousands of travellers. Heavy downpours also disrupted practice and qualifying sessions for Formula One's Japanese Grand Prix in Suzuka, with the event featuring qualifying and the race in a single day as a result. The highest storm total amount was noted at Omaezaki, where a 413 mm deluge was seen between late on the 6th and 9th, with 360 mm falling in a 24‑hour period. Rescuers on boats plucked dozens of residents from waterlogged homes in Shizuoka Prefecture. Damages from the storm amounted to $603 million (2004 USD).

=== Typhoon Tokage (Siony) ===
- Very strong typhoon (JMA)
- Category 4 typhoon (SSHWS)
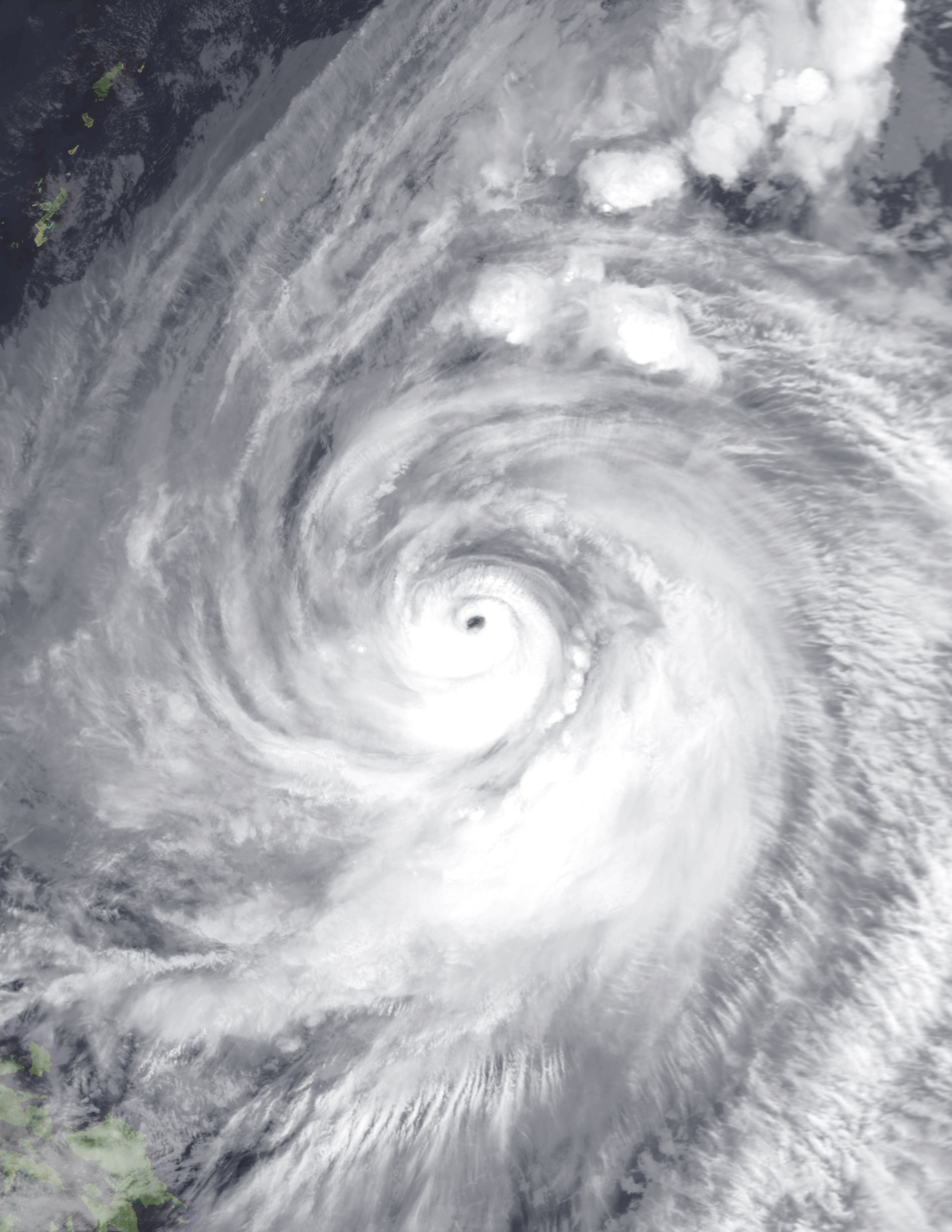
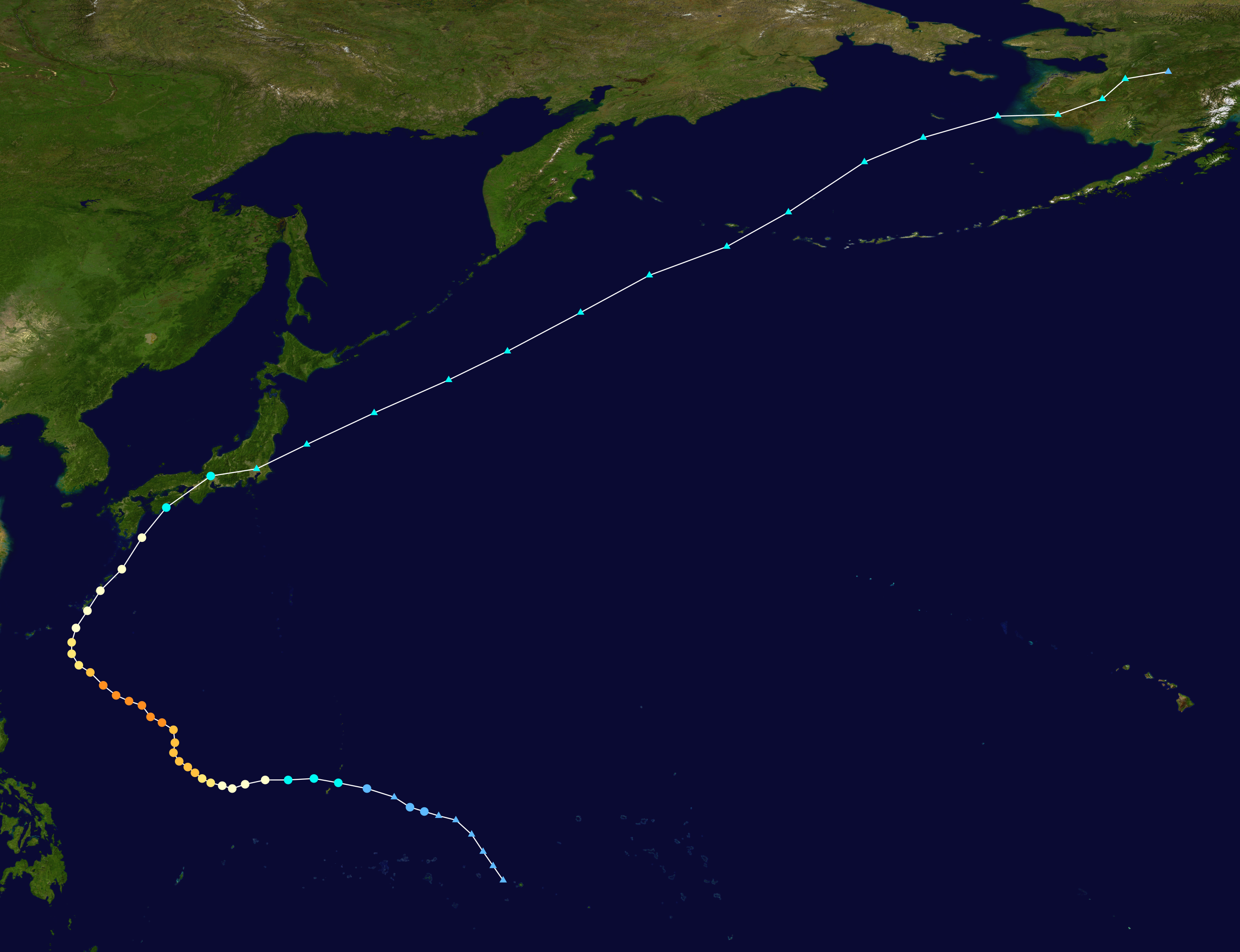
- Duration: October 12 – October 20
- Peak intensity: 155 km/h (100 mph) (10-min); 940 hPa (mbar)

Tokage is the Japanese word for lizard. On October 12, an area of convection existed 480 miles east-southeast of Guam. The system developed into Tropical Depression 27W later that day, moving in a west-northwesterly at 15 kn about 200 miles east of Guam. On October 13, the system developed into a tropical storm, and was named Tokage, subsequently moving very close to the islands of Rota and Guam. Typhoon intensity was achieved early on October 14 when centered 970 miles southeast of Okinawa. Later that day, Tokage briefly turned to the west-southwest. The storm's path curved back to a northwesterly heading by the October 15. The storm curled towards the north as a major shortwave over weakened the subtropical ridge and by October 17, Tokage reached its peak intensity of 125 kn/145 mph. Weakening began later that day as the storm turned back to a more northwesterly heading towards Okinawa and Japan. On October 18, Typhoon Tokage was 290 miles south of Kadena Air Base, Okinawa. Recurvature back to the north-northeast towards Japan ensued while the typhoon slowly weakened. Tokage made its closest approach to Okinawa late on October 19 when it was passed just to the south-southeast. The storm turned to the northeast as continued to accelerate as its extratropical transition began. Tokage made landfall over Tosa-Shimizu, near the southern tip of Shikoku, Japan still at typhoon strength. By October 21, the cyclone weakened into a tropical storm 130 nmi west of Tokyo, and later that day, the system completed the transition to a nontropical low. The extratropical remains of Tokage moved rapidly northeastward, crossing the International Date Line around midday on October 23.

The highest measured wind gust was 142 mph/63.7 m/s at Unzendake, Nagasaki on October 20. The lowest pressure from a land station was 949.4 mb at Okinoerabu, Kagoshima late on October 19. The highest rainfall amount noted in Japan was 550 mm at Fukuharaasahi between late on October 17 and 21, with 470 mm falling within a 24‑hour period. Tokage was regarded as the deadliest storm to strike Japan since Typhoon Bess in 1982. A total of 95 deaths were attributed to high winds, flooding and mudslides caused by Tokage, with an additional three people reported missing. A total of 18,000 people were forced to evacuate their homes. Damages from the storm amounted to $3.23 billion (2004 USD).

=== Typhoon Nock-ten (Tonyo) ===
- Very strong typhoon (JMA)
- Category 3 typhoon (SSHWS)
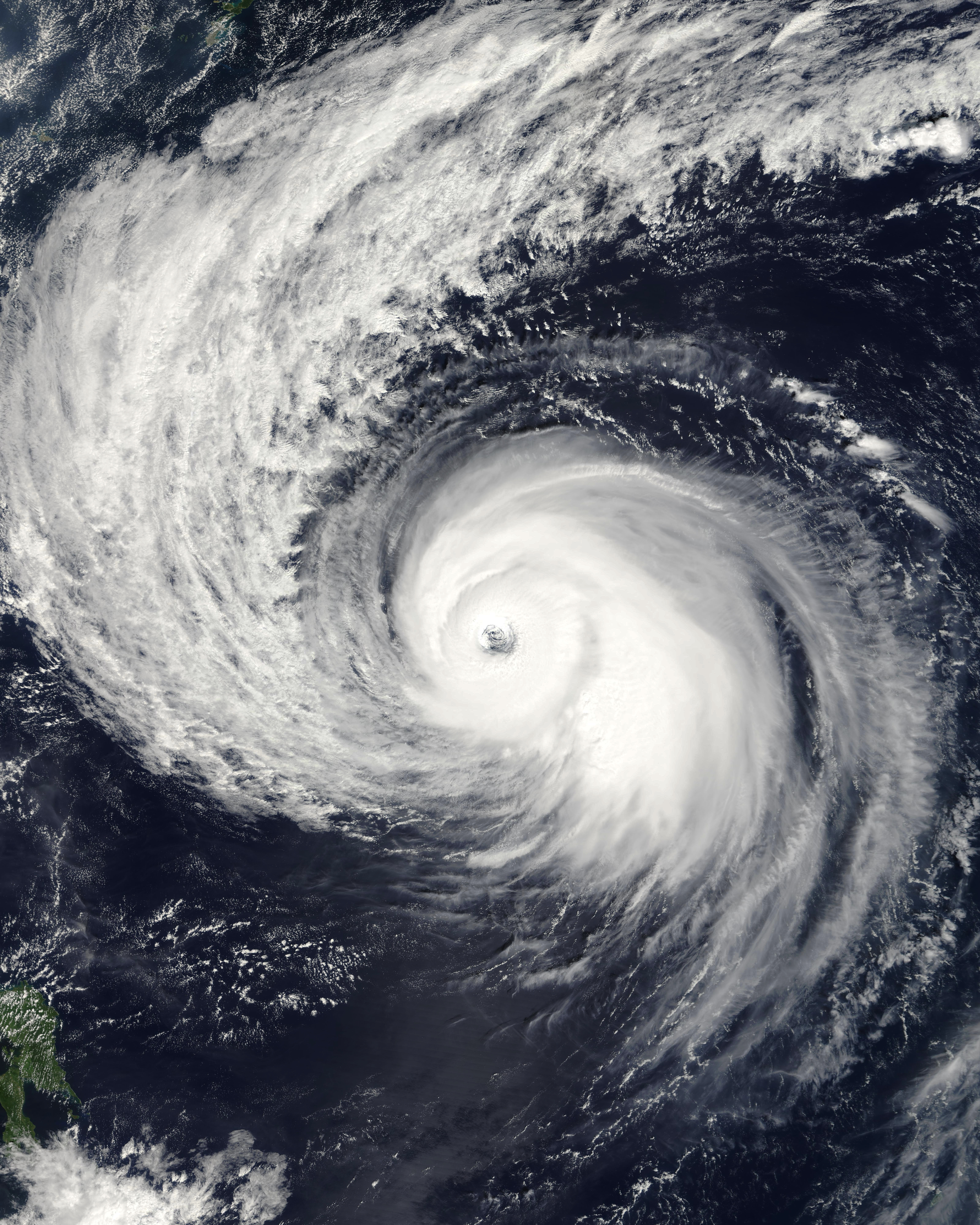
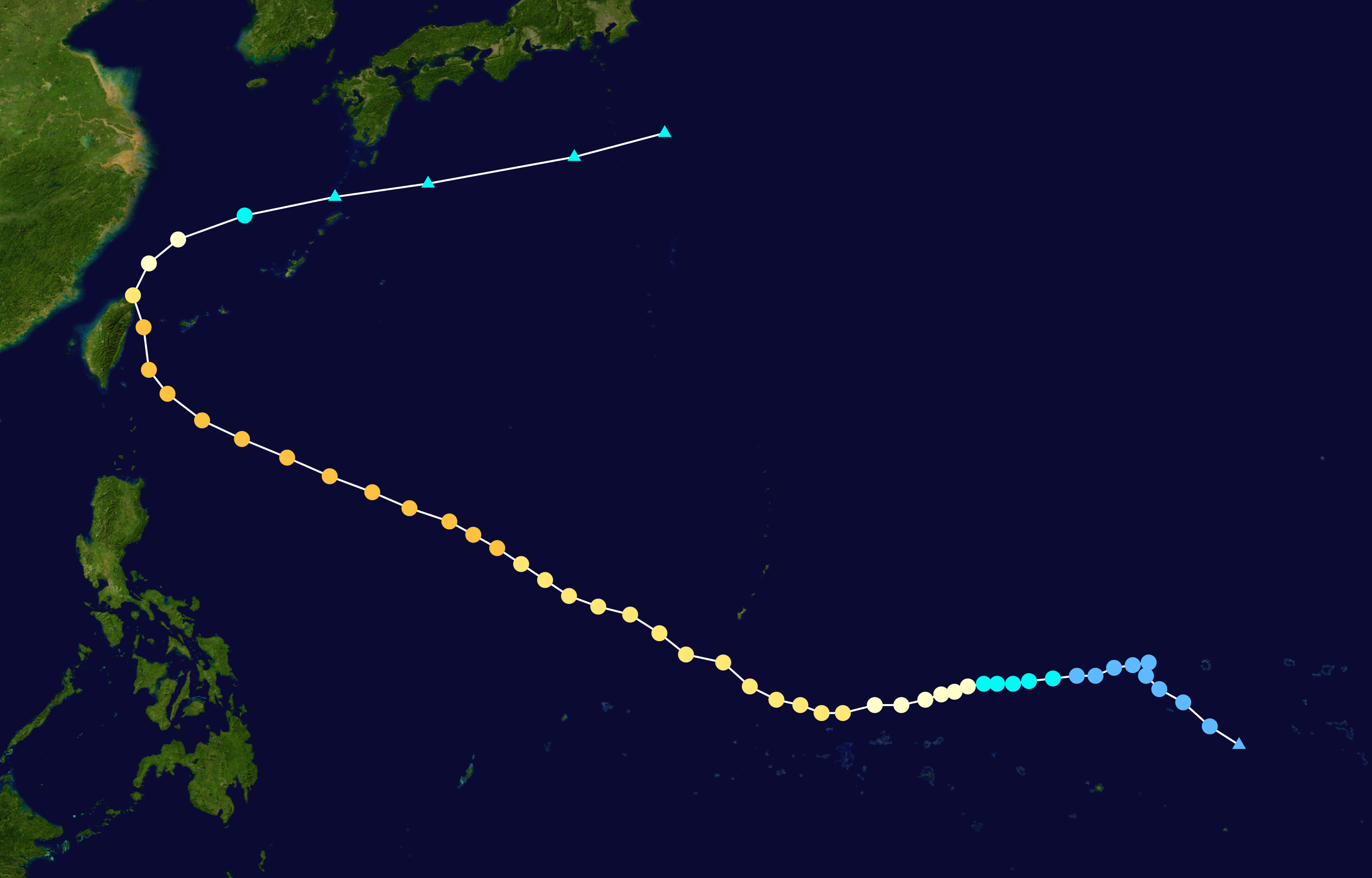
- Duration: October 14 – October 26
- Peak intensity: 155 km/h (100 mph) (10-min); 945 hPa (mbar)

Typhoon Nock-ten originated from a disturbance that formed amongst the Marshall Islands early on October 13 while 45 miles west of Kwajalein Atoll. Tropical Depression 28W developed on October 14 about 275 miles east-northeast of Pohnpei and moving westward along the southern periphery of the subtropical ridge. The system assumed a more west-northwesterly track, becoming a tropical storm by late on October 16, and was named Nock-ten. Early on October 18, the storm turned southwest and slowed its forward motion. The system strengthened into a typhoon by noon local time and curved back towards the west. Nock-ten soon accelerated and moved more northwesterly, partially due to the remains of Typhoon Tokage. Typhoon Nock-ten passed 160 miles south of Guam on October 20. Nock-ten reached its peak intensity of 110 kn/125 mph on October 23 as it tracked 480 miles south of Okinawa. Turning to a northerly track, Typhoon Nock-ten passed closest to Taipei during the afternoon of October 25, lying just off the northeastern tip of Taiwan by evening. The storm weakened and by local midnight the track became north-northeast. Nock-ten's motion to the east-northeast accelerated to 26 kn/29 mph, and the typhoon had become a nontropical low by the evening of October 26.

Typhoon Nock-ten lashed northern Taiwan with powerful winds and driving rain. The highest 24‑hour rainfall on the island was 322 mm in Taipei City between early October 25 and 27. The highest wind gust measured was 122 mph/54.4 m/s in Lanyu on October 24. Three fatalities occurred as a result of flash flooding. In Japan, the highest rainfall amount was spotted at Tanegashima which recorded 133.5 mm between midday October 26 and 27.

=== Typhoon Muifa (Unding) ===
- Typhoon (JMA)
- Category 4 typhoon (SSHWS)
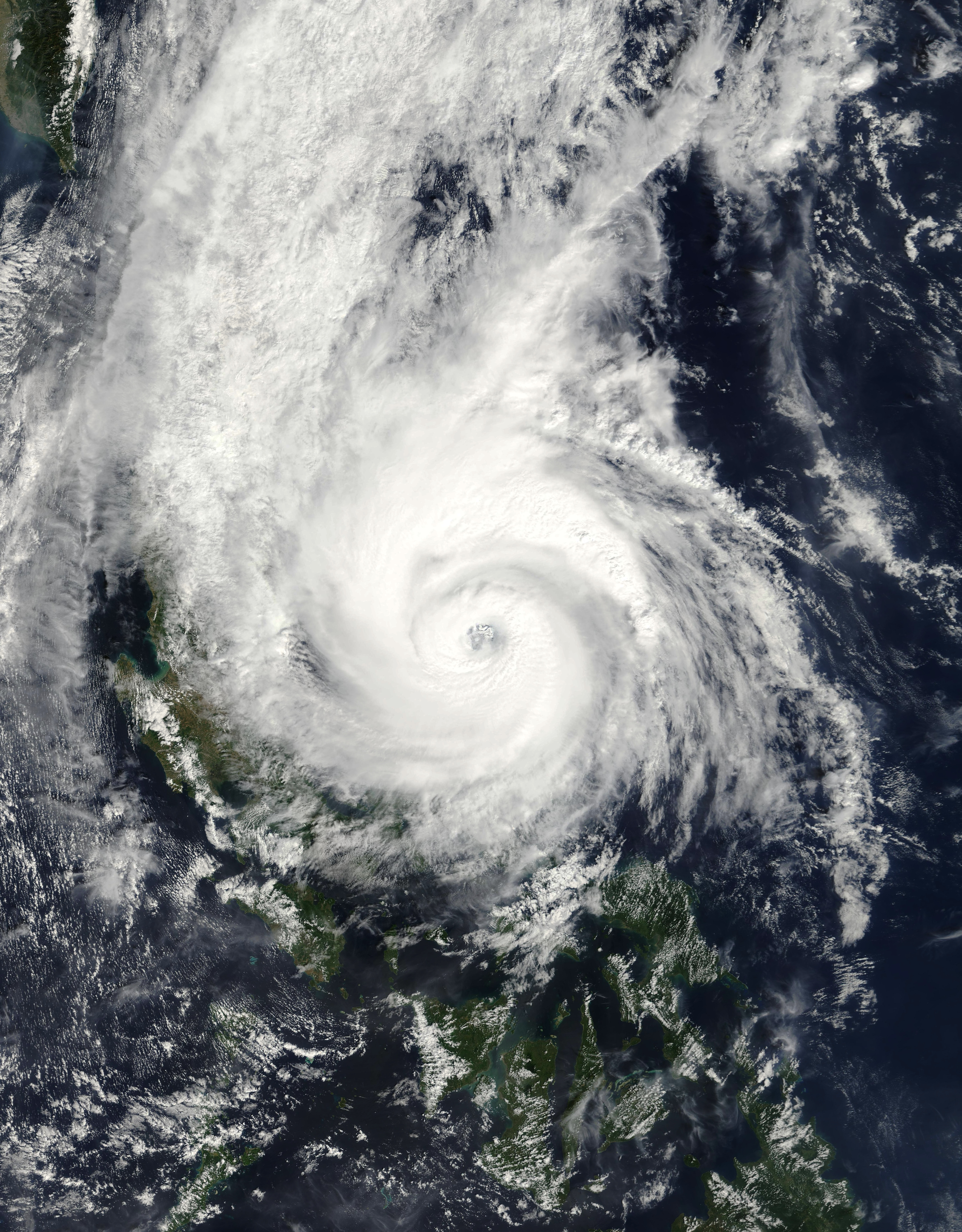
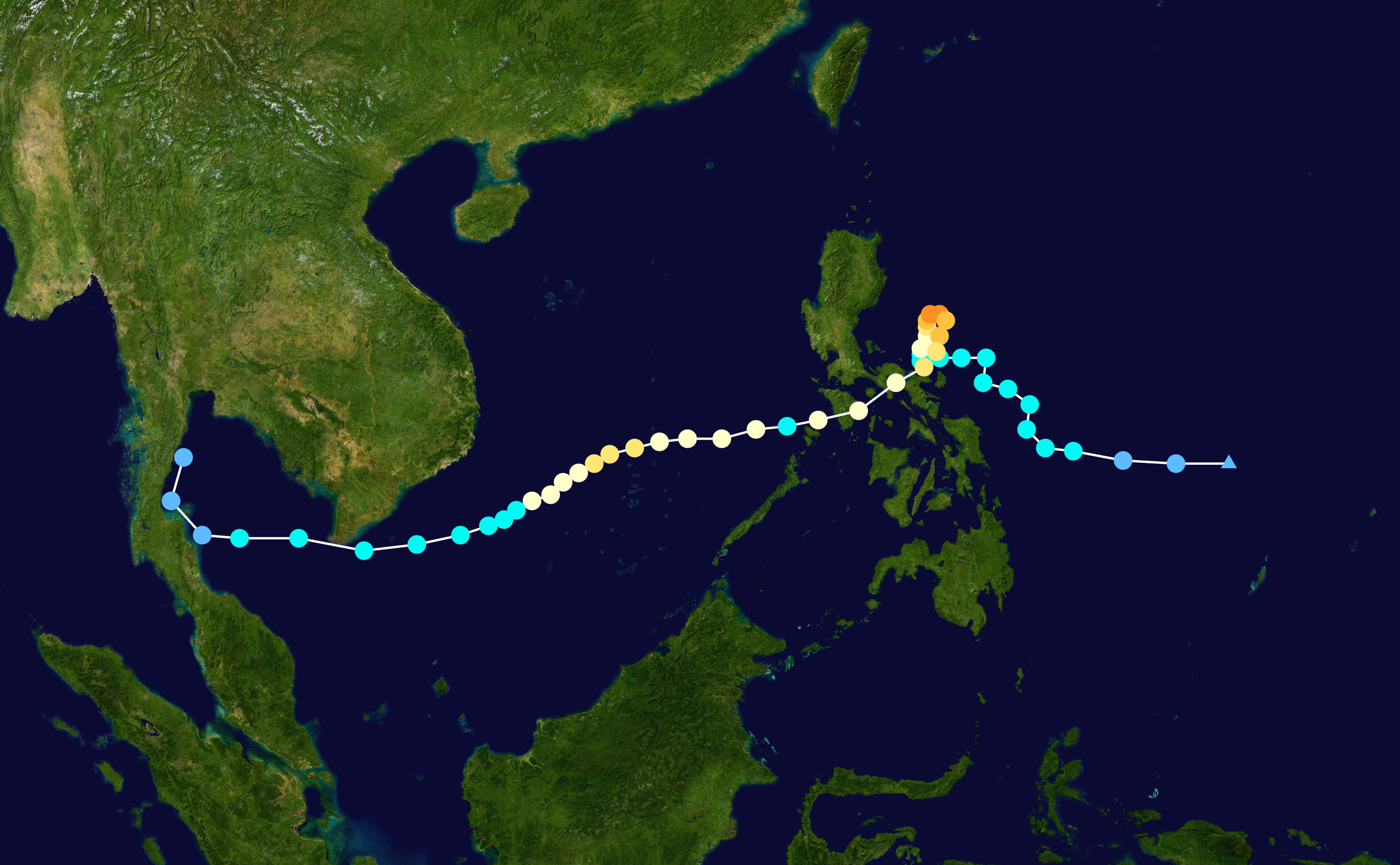
- Duration: November 14 – November 25
- Peak intensity: 150 km/h (90 mph) (10-min); 950 hPa (mbar)

The name Muifa is taken from the ume blossom. The disturbance that was to become Typhoon Muifa was noted early on November 14 when located 215 nmi north of Palau. It became Tropical Depression 29W later that day and strengthened into a tropical storm by early the 15th when centered 550 miles east-southeast of Manila, Philippines. PAGASA assigned the name Unding on the 14th as it passed the 135th meridian. On the 16th, the tropical cyclone started drifting north-northeast. Muifa turned back onto a west-northwest heading and intensified. It reached typhoon intensity on the 17th just prior to beginning a two-day clockwise loop. Late on the 18th, Muifa's intensity peaked at 115 kn/130 mph still to the east of the Philippines. Muifa made landfall very late on the 19th near Naga City with maximum winds of 70 kn/80 mph. The system ambled across the Philippine Archipelago, dropping down to tropical storm intensity on the afternoon of the 20th. On the 21st, Muifa regained typhoon intensity in the South China Sea. Now moving west-southwest, early on the 22nd Muifa re-strengthened into a 90-kn/105 mph typhoon 440 miles east of Ho Chi Minh City, Vietnam. Muifa held onto typhoon status until late on the 23rd when its weakened to a tropical storm once more. On the 25th, Tropical Storm Muifa accelerated westward at a 21 kn/23 mph clip. By early on the 26th, a weakening Tropical Depression Muifa was located 250 nmi south of Bangkok, Thailand. Later that day Muifa turned northward into an environment of increased wind shear and dissipated 120 nmi south-southwest of Bangkok.

The highest 24‑hour rainfall amount from the Philippines was 246.4 mm at Catanduanes between midday the 15th and 16th. The lowest pressure at Naga City was 986.1 mb early on the 16th. The death toll reported from the Philippines was 68 dead, 160 injured, and 69 unaccounted for. A total of 26,238 houses were destroyed and 76,062 damaged; total damage reached 1.0089 billion pesos. Typhoon Muifa had a destructive impact on Vietnam. The highest 24-hour rainfall amount reported was 251.5 mm at Prachuap Khirikhan between the afternoon of the 25th and 26th. Floods and landslides triggered by the typhoon killed about 40 people, and 40 more people were reported missing. There were also many villages in the mountains which needed urgent relief but which could not be quickly reached. Hội An, which is the town of world heritage, was hit by the flood, and more than 80 old houses were in danger of collapse.

=== Tropical Storm Merbok (Violeta) ===
- Tropical storm (JMA)
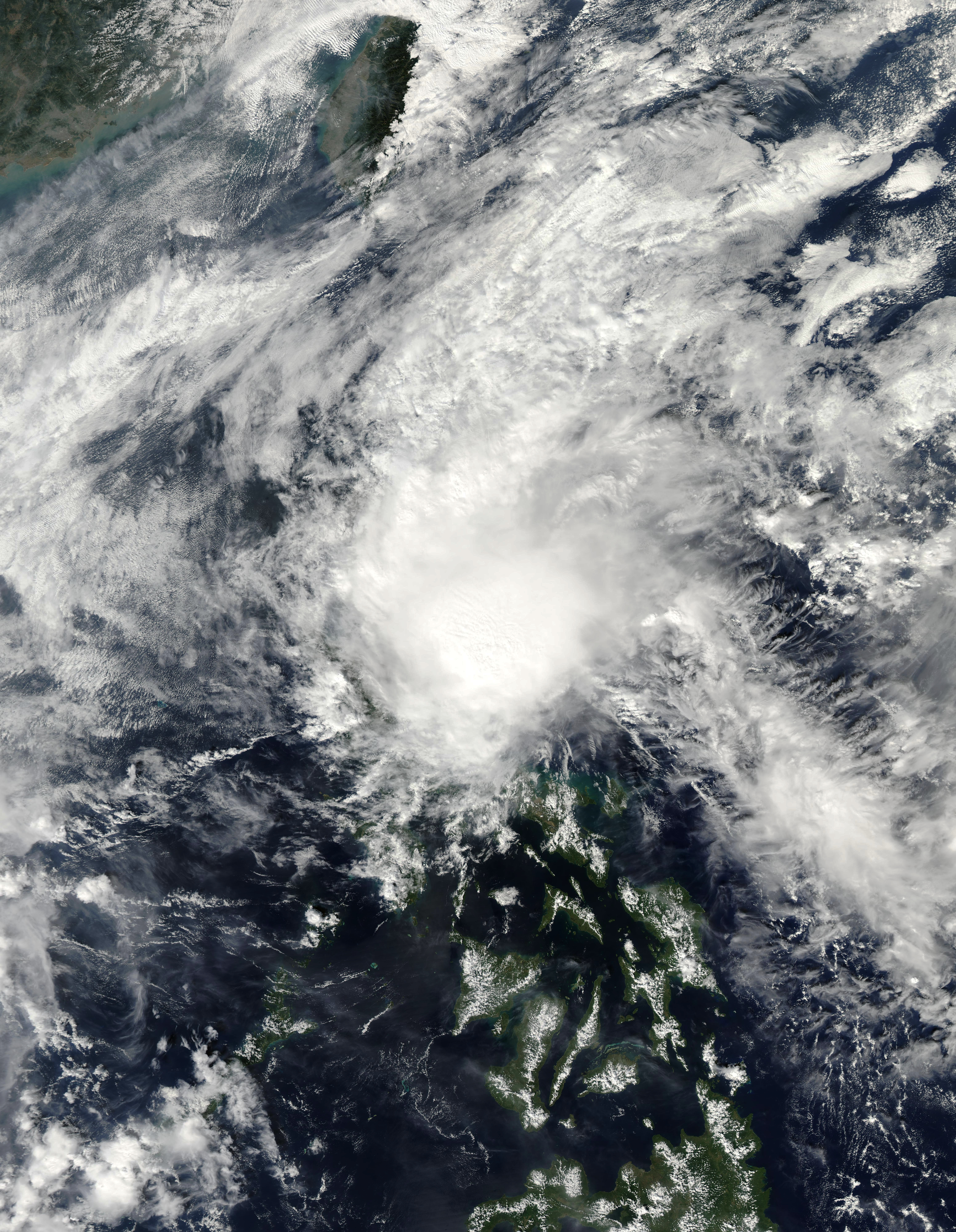
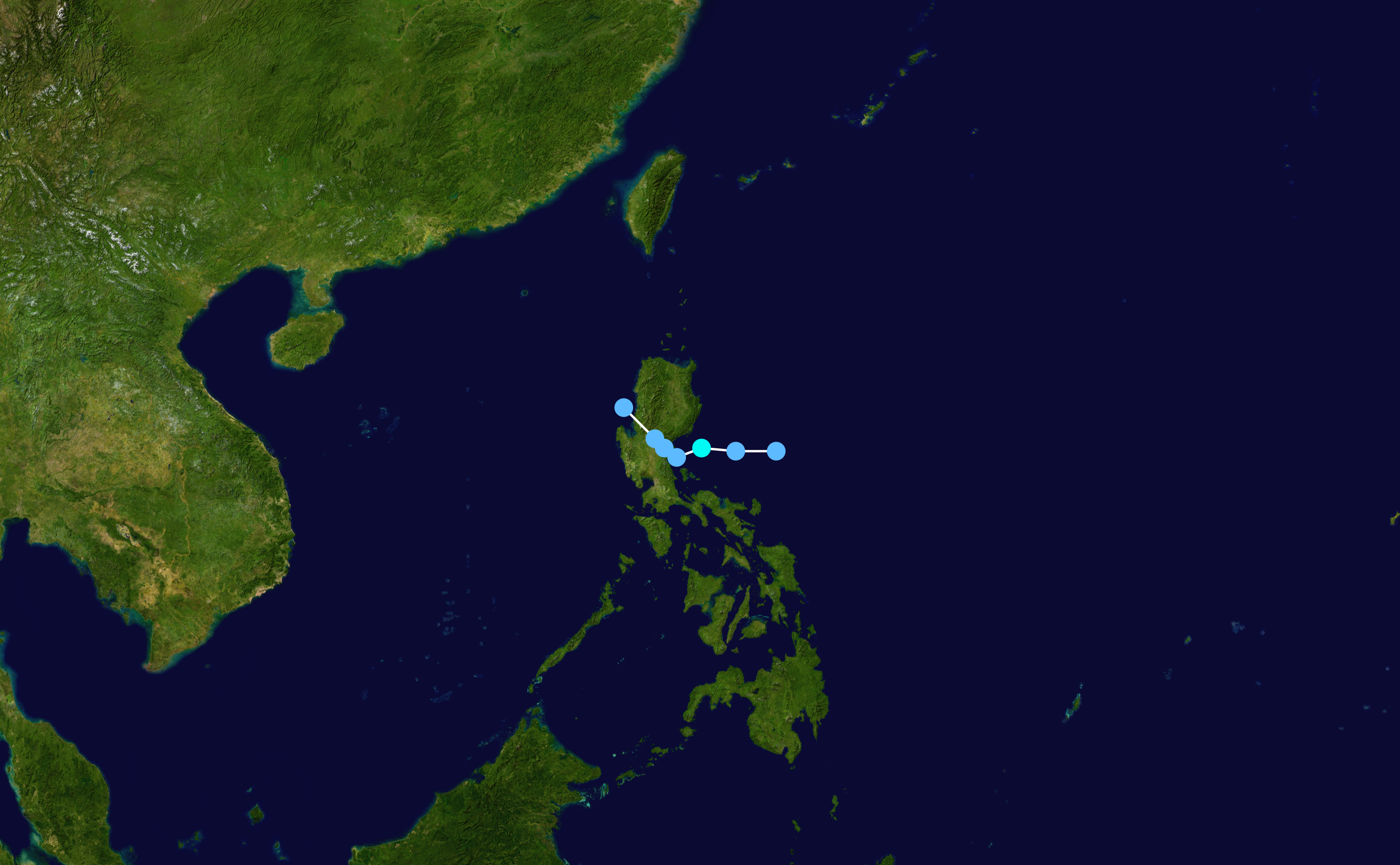
- Duration: November 21 – November 23
- Peak intensity: 65 km/h (40 mph) (10-min); 1000 hPa (mbar)

Merbok is the Malaysian word for the spotted-necked dove. This is the first tropical cyclone recognized by the Japan Meteorological Agency, but not by the Joint Typhoon Warning Center, since Changmi in 2002.

The heaviest rainfall in the Philippines from this cyclone was 185.2 mm at Casiguran between midday the 22nd and 23rd.

=== Tropical Depression Winnie ===
- Tropical depression (PAGASA)
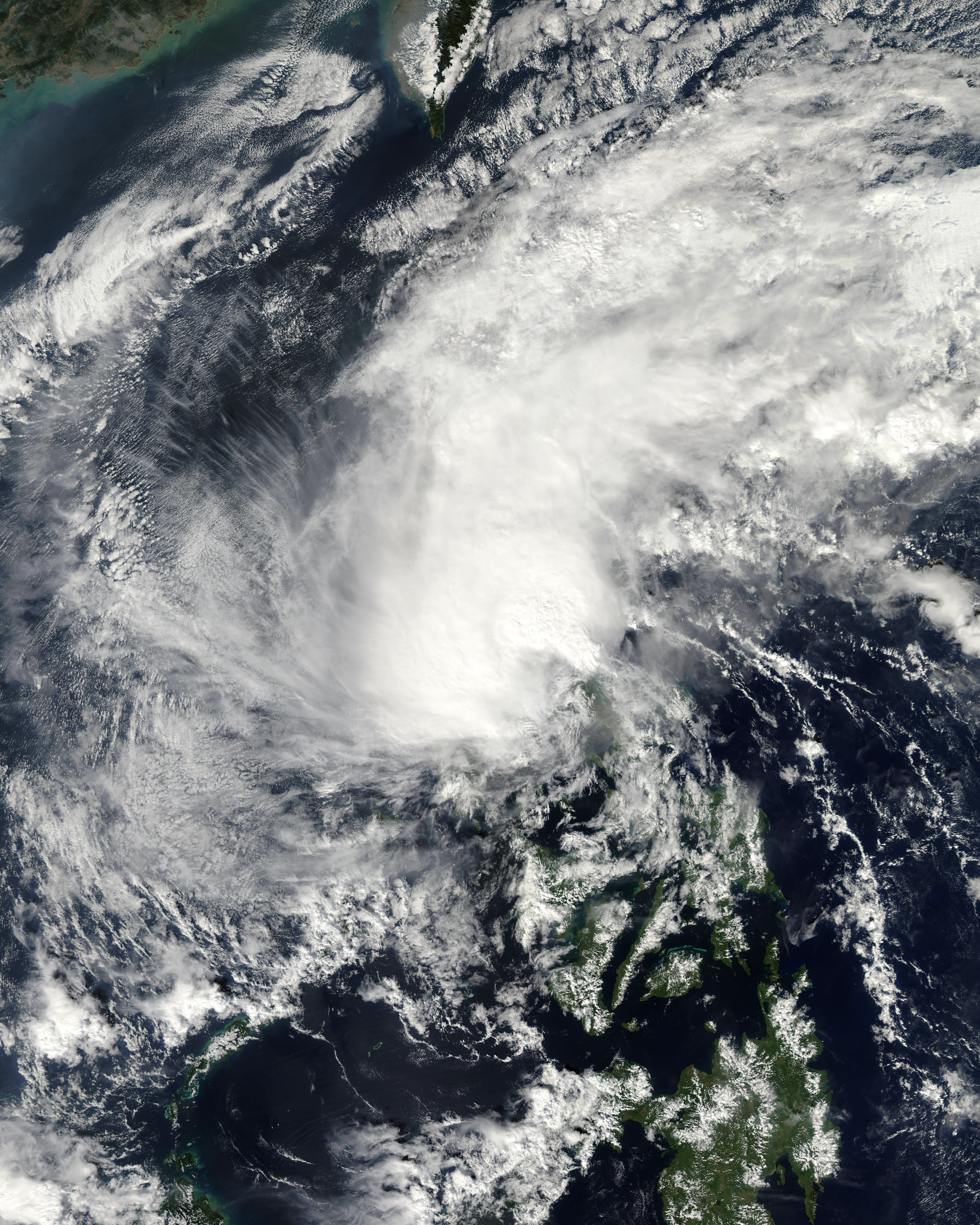
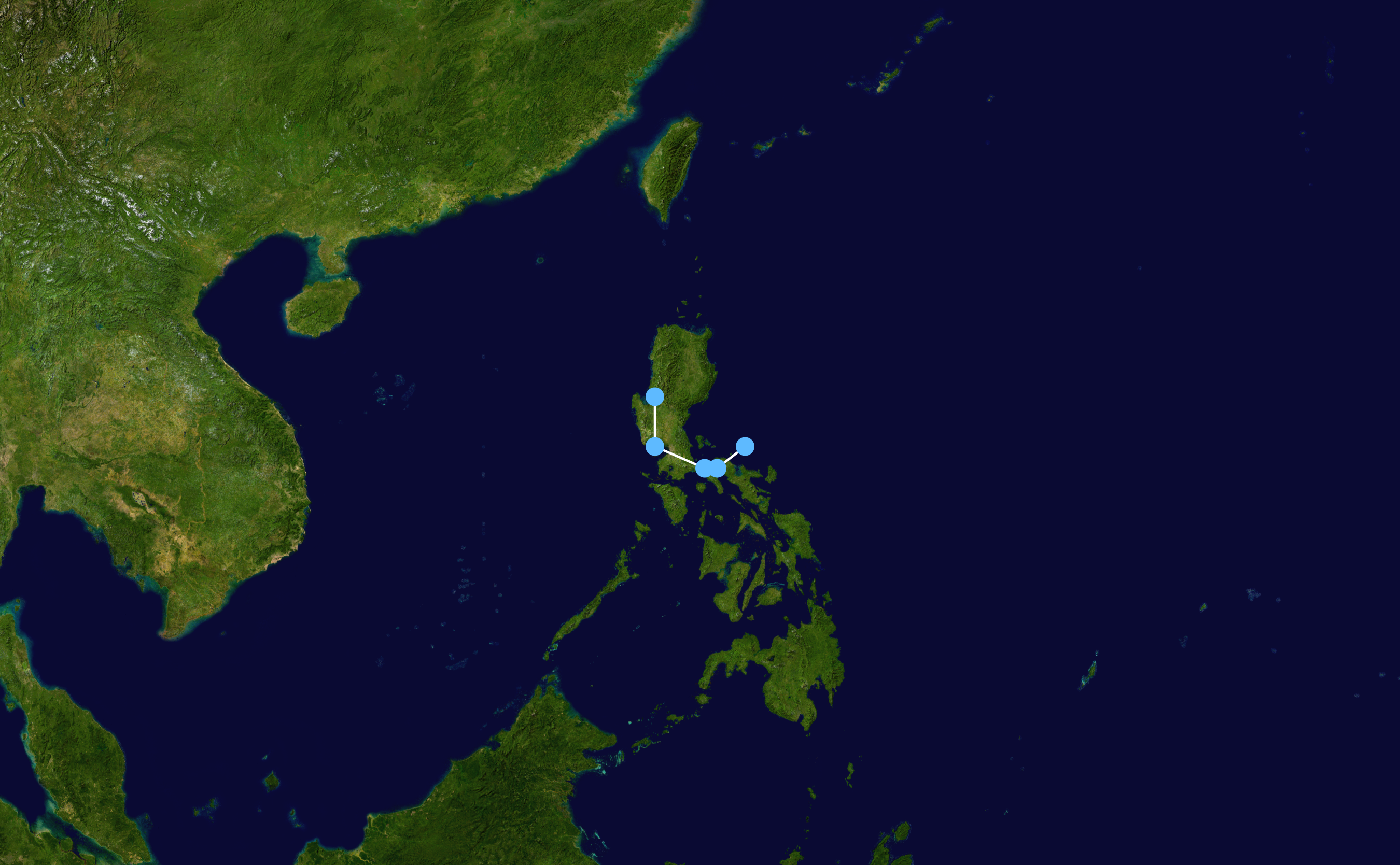
- Duration: November 27 – November 30
- Peak intensity: 55 km/h (35 mph) (10-min); 1000 hPa (mbar)

Tropical Depression Winnie was a large system which brought torrential rains to Luzon, resulting in deadly flashfloods and landslides. Winnie formed east of the central Philippines on the November 27. JMA and the Central Weather Bureau of Taiwan were the only other agencies classifying Winnie as a tropical depression. The system moved west-northwestward over southeastern Luzon on the 29th. After moving well inland over Luzon, Winnie turned to a more north-northwesterly track up the west side of the island and was last mentioned on the 30th when it was located along the northwestern Luzon coast.

According to news reports in the Philippines, 1,404 people were killed or left missing during the passage of Tropical Depression Winnie, primarily due to massive flashfloods and landslides in Quezon and Aurora provinces triggered by the attendant heavy rains. The highest rainfall report from this system was 157.8 mm from Cabanatuan between midday November 29 and 30. Damages from the storm amounted to $15.8 million.

=== Typhoon Nanmadol (Yoyong) ===
- Very strong typhoon (JMA)
- Category 4 super typhoon (SSHWS)
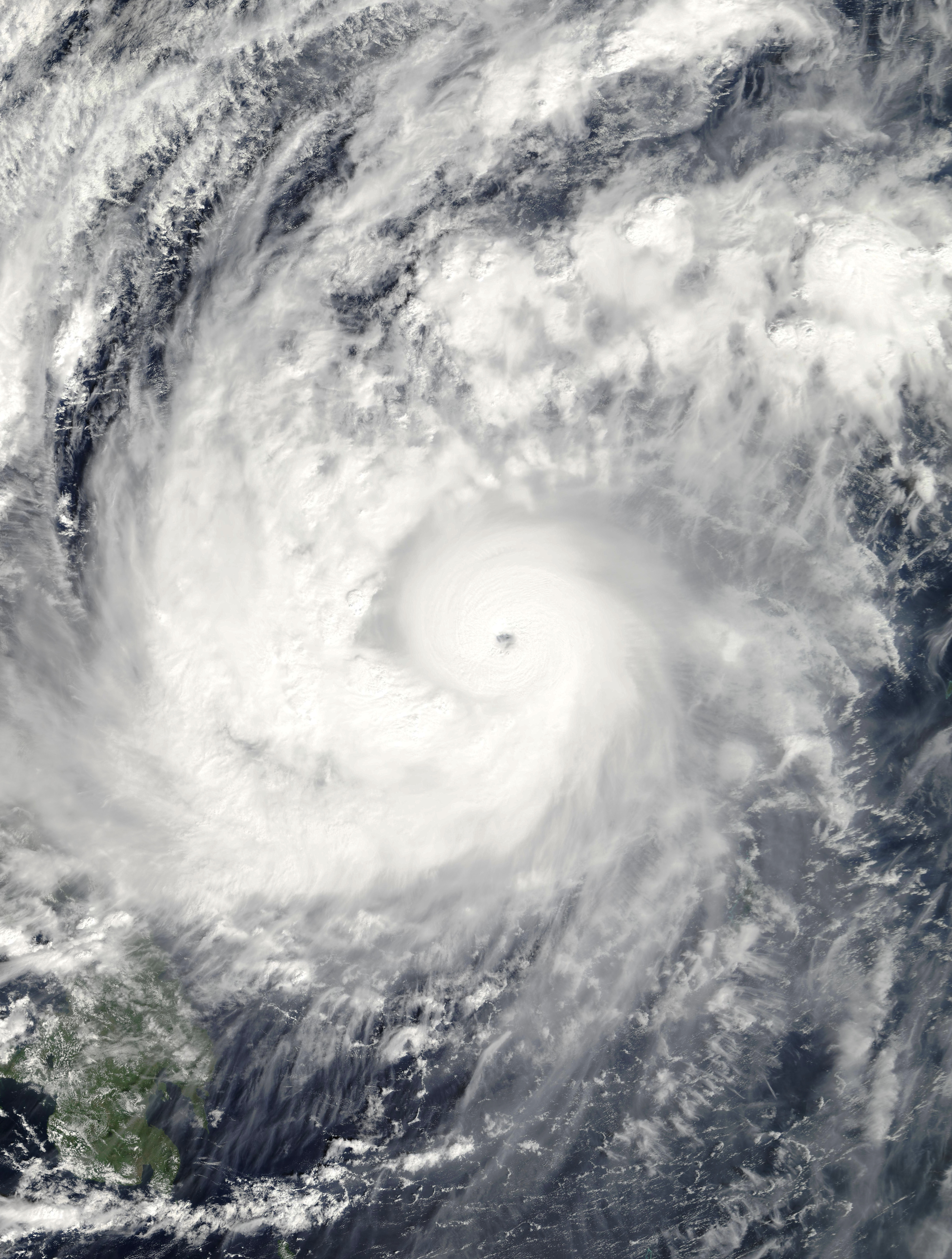
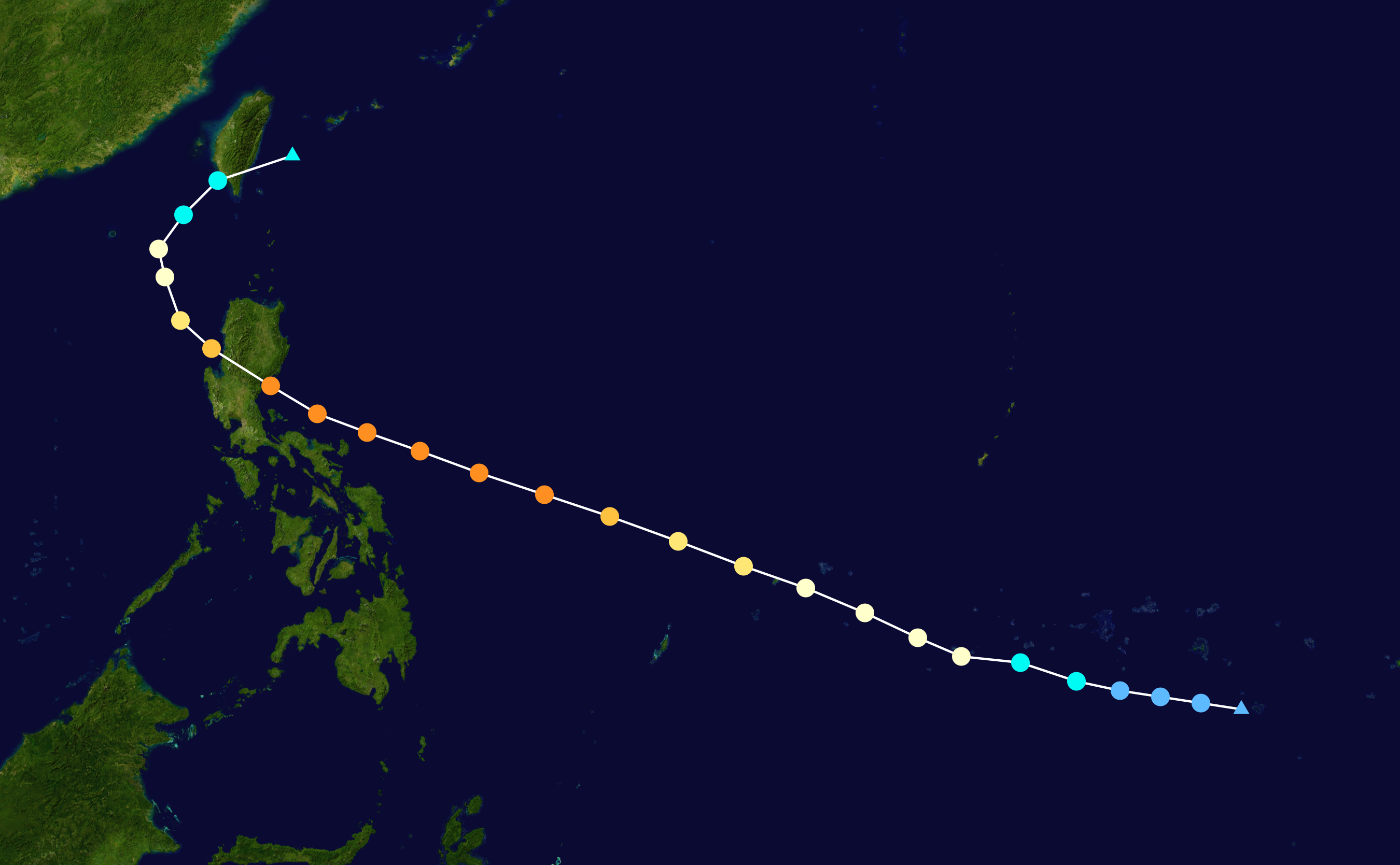
- Duration: November 29 – December 4
- Peak intensity: 165 km/h (105 mph) (10-min); 935 hPa (mbar)

The name Nanmadol is from a famous ruin found on Pohnpei. Super Typhoon Nanmadol developed from a cluster of thunderstorms that was first noted early on November 28 when it was located 155 nmi south-southwest of Pohnpei. It developed into Tropical Depression 30W about 690 miles east-southeast of Yap, and into Tropical Storm Nanmadol by midday November 29 as it moved westward south of the subtropical ridge. Nanmadol continued to strengthen, reaching typhoon intensity late that day after passing south of Satawal. The storm's track curved to the west-northwest. Late on November 30, the storm passed just north of Yap, bringing typhoon-force gusts and sustained tropical storm strength winds. The tropical cyclone reached its peak intensity of 130 kn/150 mph midday on December 2, then a super typhoon, 220 miles east of Manila, Philippines. Super Typhoon Nanmadol soon arrived at the Luzon coastline. At this time, the system began to lose strength and was downgraded from super typhoon status.

Turning northwestward Typhoon Nanmadol took roughly six hours to cross the island of Luzon, and by early on December 3 had re-emerged back over water. The northwesterly turn took Nanmadol into a weakness in the subtropical ridge before being lured away by a major shortwave trough. Nanmadol weakened markedly during December 3 as it gradually veered more towards the north. The cloud pattern became increasingly asymmetrical as Nanmadol moved east-northeastward across southern Taiwan before becoming extratropical during the afternoon of December 4. Nanmadol became the first known December tropical cyclone for 108 years to make landfall on the island. The remnants of Super Typhoon Nanmadol continued to rapidly move to the east-northeast and northeast and ultimately merged with another low-pressure area, forming a powerful extratropical cyclone which brought strong winds and led to unseasonably warm temperatures to Japan.

Because Muifa, Merbok, Winnie, and Nanmadol all occurred within a space of two weeks, the exact number of casualties and total cost of damages is difficult to determine. Nanmadol caused at least 70 fatalities and 157 injuries. Nanmadol destroyed 10,457 houses and damaged 57,435. Agriculture also suffered badly as a result of this typhoon with losses amounting to ₱2.036 billion in the Philippines. The maximum rain in the Philippines was 228.1 mm at Daet between midday on December 2 and 3. In Taiwan, as much as 907 mm fell in Hualien county between early December 3 and 4. Puluowan reported the highest storm total accumulation of 1090 mm during the 35-hr period ending on the afternoon of December 4. In China, 106.3 mm fell at Dachen Dao between the morning of December 3 and 4. In Taiwan, 2 deaths were reported, and agricultural losses there were estimated to have been NT$670 million.

=== Tropical Storm Talas (Zosimo) ===
- Tropical storm (JMA)
- Tropical storm (SSHWS)
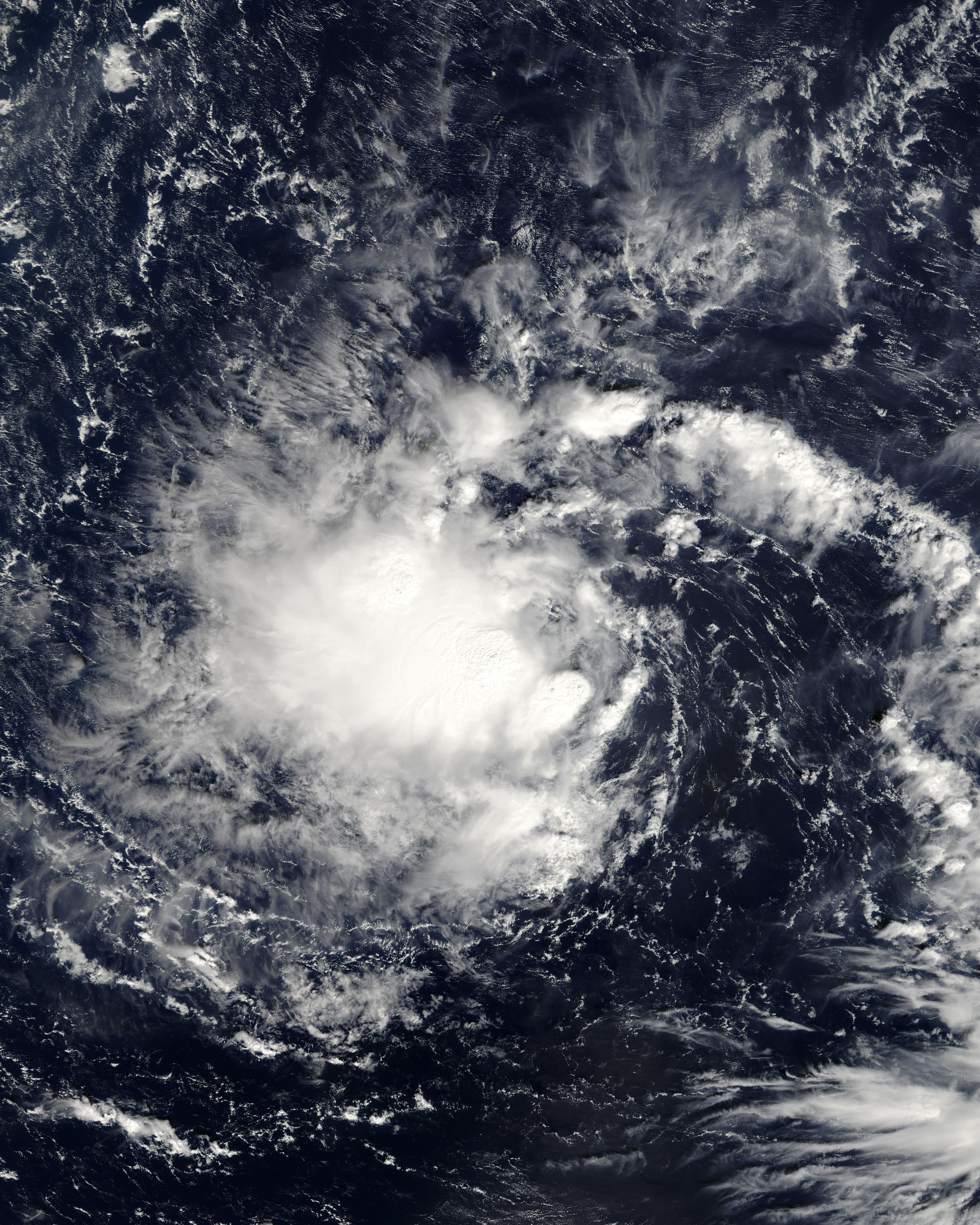
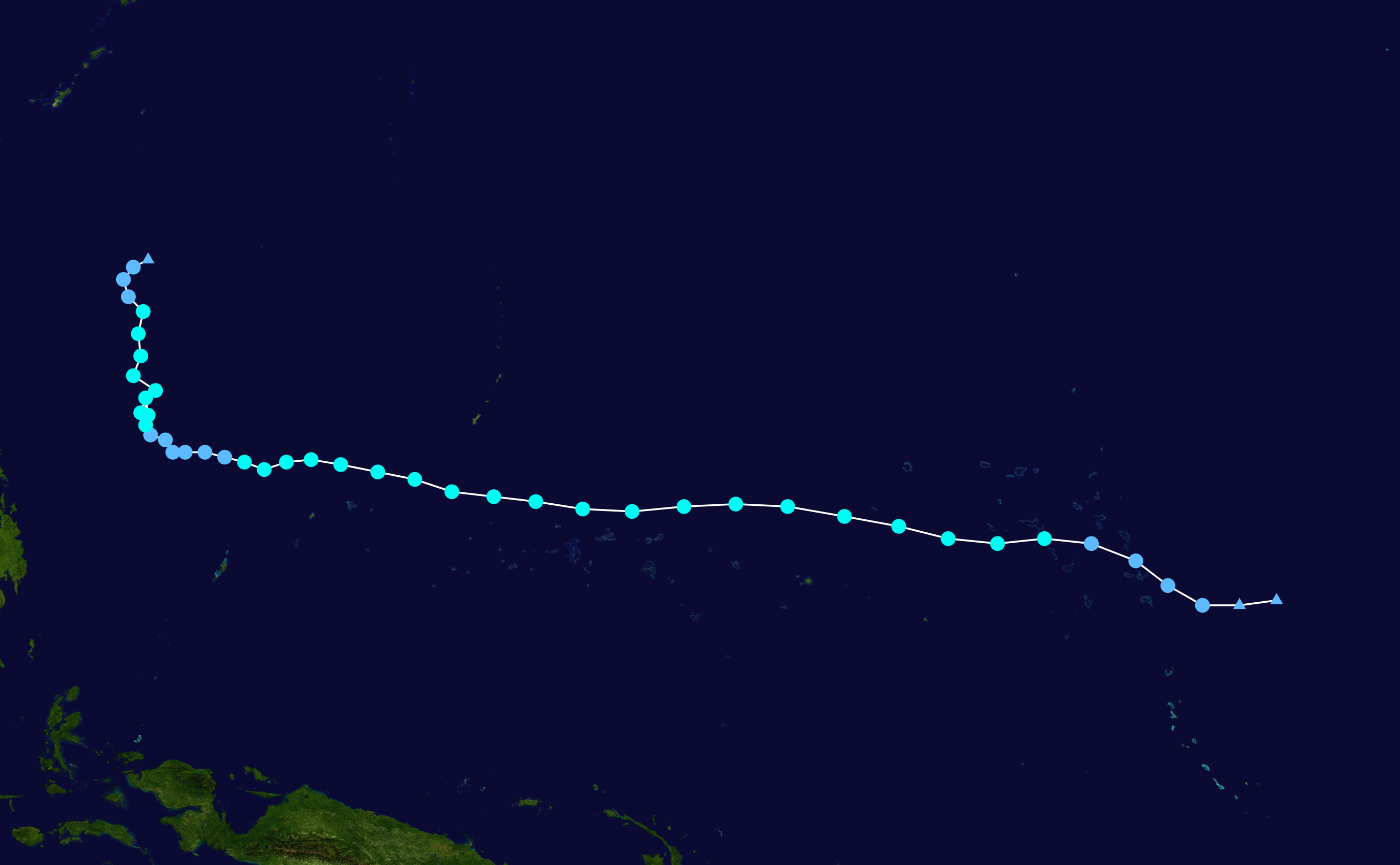
- Duration: December 9 – December 20
- Peak intensity: 75 km/h (45 mph) (10-min); 995 hPa (mbar)

Tropical Depression 31W, which formed on December 10 near Kwajalein, became a tropical storm later that day. Talas moved to the west, peaking at 45 kn/50 mph before weakening due to lack of outflow. A break in the subtropical ridge allowed Talas to turn northward, where it reached 45 kn/50 mph winds before dissipating on December 19. Talas is Filipino for 'acuteness' or 'sharpness'.

Between December 10 and 11, Talas produced light rainfall, peaked at 8.4 mm (0.33 in) in Kwajalein with winds reaching 74 km/h (46 mph) and gusting to 103 km/h (64 mph). After passing Kwajelein, the center of Talas brushed Ebeye, producing gale-force winds on the island. Little impact was recorded on Ujae as the storm passed 90 km (56 mi) south of the island. The most severe damage was on Kwajalein; the newly constructed sandblast shelter was completely destroyed, metal doors at the local high school were blown off and the roof of the school was damaged, several metal buildings throughout the island sustained wind damage. On Ebeye, several homes had their roofs blown off and numerous coconut trees were uprooted. No damage was recorded on Ujae but crop losses were assumed to have occurred. In all, the storm caused $750,000 in damages, mainly due to the sandblast shelter. Following Talas, local governments quickly repaired damages wrought by the storm, costing $300,000.

=== Tropical Storm Noru ===
- Tropical storm (JMA)
- Tropical storm (SSHWS)
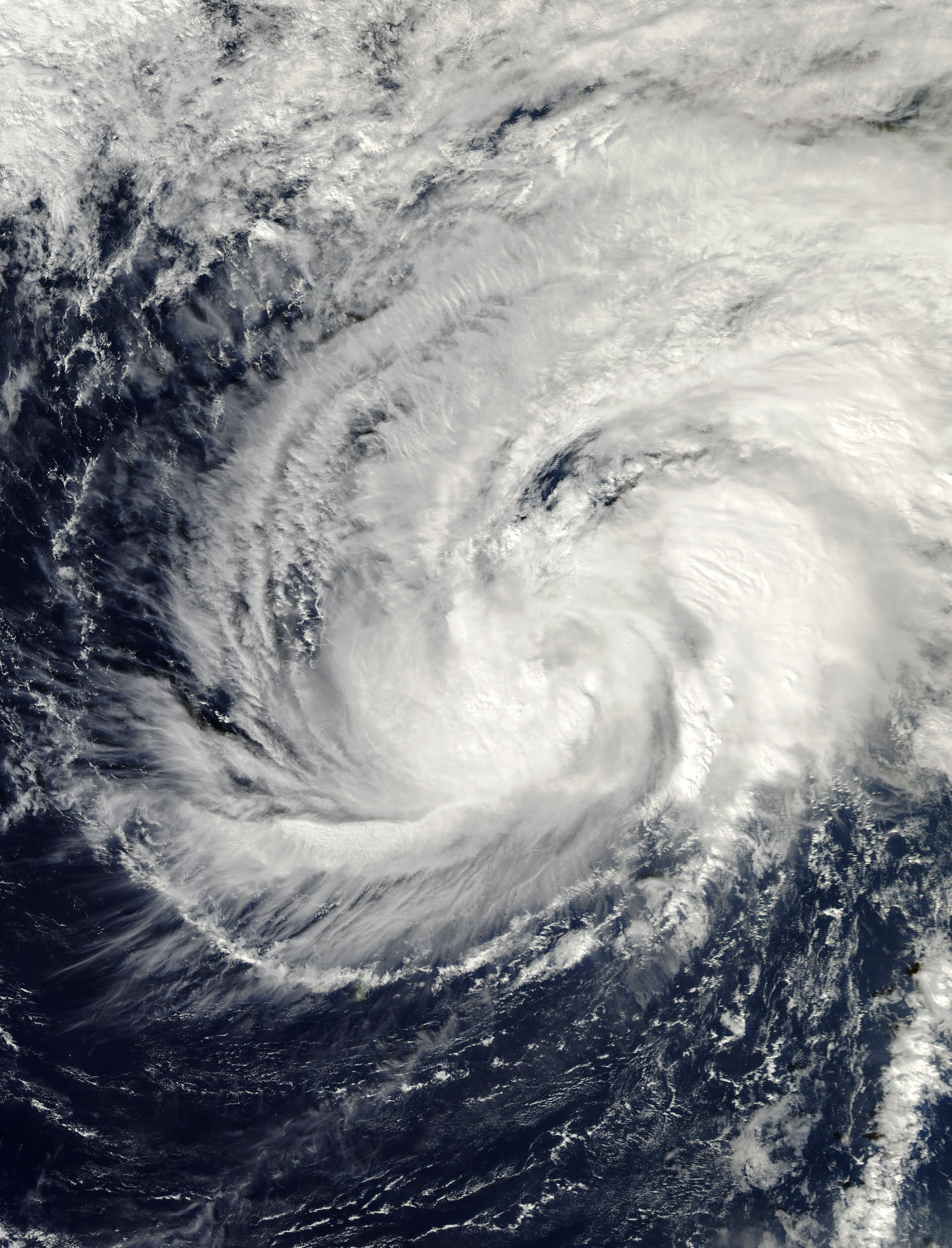
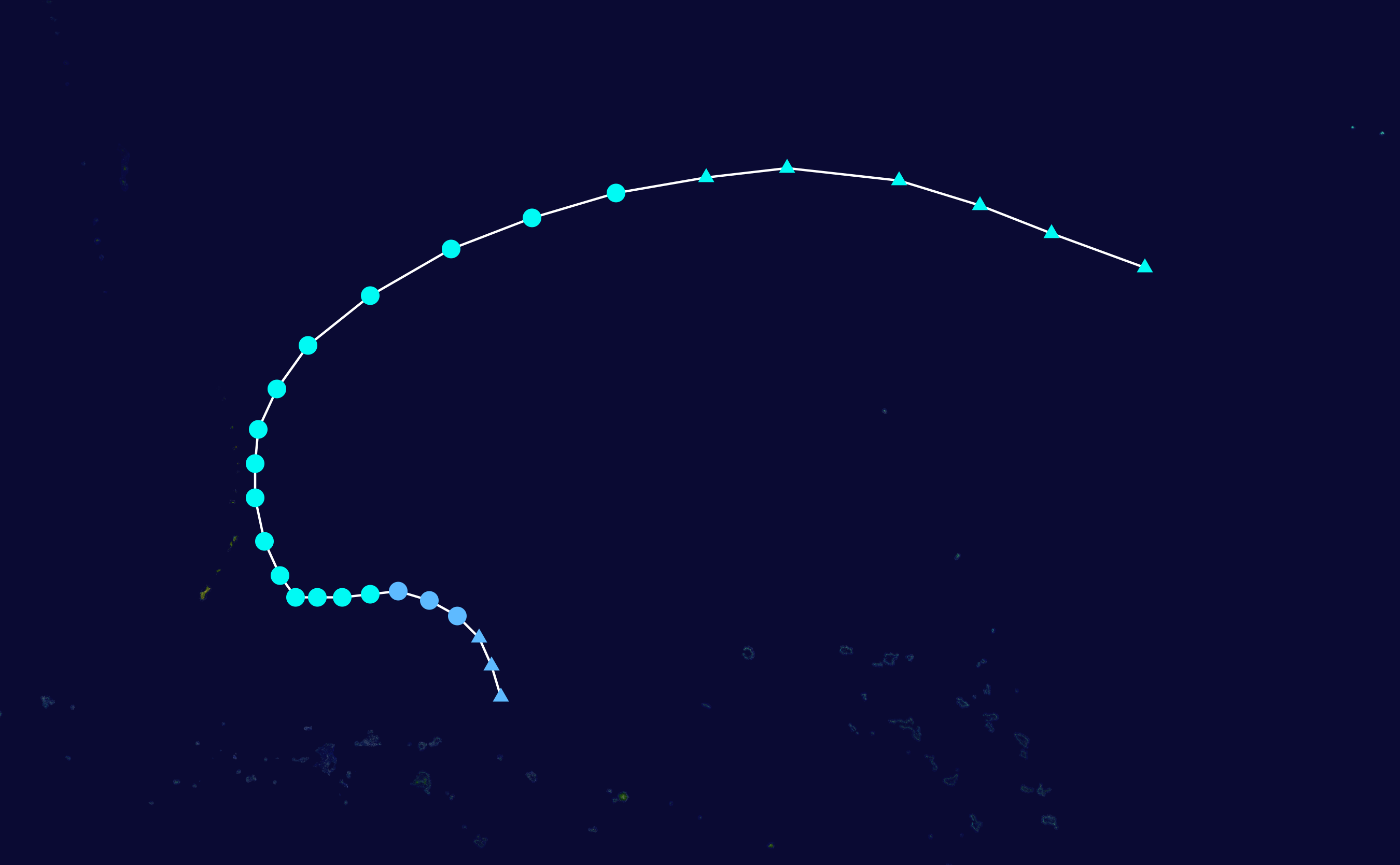
- Duration: December 17 – December 21
- Peak intensity: 75 km/h (45 mph) (10-min); 990 hPa (mbar)

The final storm of the season, Noru, formed on December 17 to the east-southeast of Saipan. After becoming a tropical storm on December 18 Noru moved to the northwest, where it peaked with 55 kn/65 mph winds. Noru turned to the northeast, and became extratropical on December 21. Noru is the Korean word for the roe deer.

Between December 19 and 20, Noru brought high winds and heavy rains to the northern Mariana Islands. Upwards of 182 mm (7.2 in) fell on Saipan, resulting in isolated flooding. Winds gusted up to 95 kilometres per hour (59 mph) but little or no wind damage resulted from the storm. No structural damage occurred due to Noru.

=== Other systems ===
- The first tropical storm of the 2004 Pacific typhoon season developed on February 10 west of Chuuk. It tracked to the west, organizing slowly due to persistent vertical wind shear. On February 13 and 14, the depression executed a clockwise loop. When the storm turned to the southwest, the wind shear overcame it, and the cyclone dissipated on February 19. The remnants of Tropical Depression Ambo dissipated, affecting Luzon by bringing flash floods and heavy rainfall on February 20 until February 22.
- The near-equatorial trough spawned a tropical disturbance east of the Philippines late on March 13. It rapidly moved northwest as it became a tropical depression in the afternoon hours of the next day. Due to warm waters and moderate convection, it rapidly intensified, with a brief turn to the southwest. On March 17, it reached peak intensity as a tropical storm, with the PAGASA naming it as Butchoy. The system rapidly weakened on March 19, just before the storm was about to hit the Philippines. A weak trough brought it northward, where dry air and vertical shear caused it to dissipate on March 23.
- A small tropical disturbance rapidly formed, moving southwest on May 12. The small system rapidly built up on May 13. The next day, the JTWC classified it as Tropical Depression 05W. 05W moved west, affecting Vietnam and reached peak intensity as a tropical storm on May 15 and 16. With two other systems in the Western Pacific, Typhoon Nida and Tropical Storm Omais, 05W turned eastwards, weakening on May 17. Dissipating on May 18, and due to the strong pull of the outflow of Typhoon Nida at peak intensity, the remnants of 05W rapidly moved and was located about east of Philippines and was absorbed by a trough on May 20. The circulation fully dissipated on May 25 as it was absorbed by a monsoonal trough.
- On August 24, an area of convection with a possible weak low-level circulation center developed approximately 1,125 km (699 mi) east-southeast of Guam, and was moving slowly towards the west-northwest. It was designated as a tropical depression on August 26 by the JMA. Shortly after, the JTWC designated the system as Tropical Depression 21W. The depression gradually intensified and was upgraded to Tropical Storm 21W by the JTWC early on August 27 when located about 590 km (370 mi) east of Guam; however, in its post-season analysis, the JTWC would assess 21W peaking as a tropical depression. The depression reached its peak intensity at 0000 UTC on August 27 with winds of 55 km/h (34 mph) and a minimum pressure of 1000 hPa (mbar). By later that day, the center had become fully exposed with the deep convection being displaced westward over Guam, due to strong outflow from Typhoon Chaba to its north. The weakening system would dissipate on the 31st when the weak low was located approximately 1,210 km (750 mi) west of Saipan. No damage or casualties are known to have resulted from the depression.
- This system was considered a tropical depression by JMA, PAGASA, the Central Weather Bureau of Taiwan and the Thai Meteorological Department with PAGASA assigning the name Pablo. JTWC released no warnings, but issued a pair of Tropical Cyclone Formation Alerts (TCFA) early on September 17 and 18. Tropical Depression Pablo formed deep in the Philippine Sea east of Mindanao, moved westward across that island, thence turning northwestward and emerging into the South China Sea near the Calamian group. After crossing the Philippine Archipelago, the depression began to slowly weaken but limped across the South China Sea to near the central Vietnamese coastline before dissipating on the 18th where it dropped moderate to heavy rainfall. The maximum winds estimated by any agency were 30 kn/35 mph.

== Storm names ==
Within the North-western Pacific Ocean, both the Japan Meteorological Agency (JMA) and the Philippine Atmospheric, Geophysical and Astronomical Services Administration assign names to tropical cyclones that develop in the Western Pacific, which can result in a tropical cyclone having two names. The Japan Meteorological Agency's RSMC Tokyo — Typhoon Center assigns international names to tropical cyclones on behalf of the World Meteorological Organization's Typhoon Committee, should they be judged to have 10-minute sustained windspeeds of 65 km/h (40 mph). While the Philippine Atmospheric, Geophysical and Astronomical Services Administration assigns names to tropical cyclones which move into or form as a tropical depression in their area of responsibility located between 135°E and 115°E and between 5°N-25°N even if the cyclone has had an international name assigned to it. The names of significant tropical cyclones are retired, by both PAGASA and the Typhoon Committee. Should the list of names for the Philippine region be exhausted then names will be taken from an auxiliary list of which the first ten are published each season. Unused names are marked in gray.

=== International names ===
During the season 29 named tropical cyclones developed in the Western Pacific and were named by the Japan Meteorological Agency, when it was determined that they had become tropical storms. These names were contributed to a list of a 140 names submitted by the fourteen members nations and territories of the ESCAP/WMO Typhoon Committee. Each of the names in this list was used for the first time (and only, in the cases of Sudal, Tingting, and Rananim).

Sudal	Nida	Omais	Conson	Chanthu	Dianmu	Mindulle	Tingting	Kompasu	Namtheun	Malou	Meranti	Rananim	Malakas	Megi
Chaba	Aere	Songda	Sarika	Haima	Meari	Ma-on	Tokage	Nock-ten	Muifa	Merbok	Nanmadol	Talas	Noru	

=== Philippines ===
Ambo	Butchoy	Cosme	Dindo	Enteng
Frank	Gener	Helen	Igme	Julian
Karen	Lawin	Marce	Nina	Ofel
Pablo	Quinta	Rolly	Siony	Tonyo
Unding	Violeta	Winnie	Yoyong	Zosimo
Auxiliary list
Alakdan (unused)	Baldo (unused)	Clara (unused)	Dencio (unused)	Estong (unused)
Felipe (unused)	Gardo (unused)	Heling (unused)	Ismael (unused)	Julio (unused)

The Philippine Atmospheric, Geophysical and Astronomical Services Administration (PAGASA) uses its own naming scheme for tropical cyclones in their area of responsibility. PAGASA assigns names to tropical depressions that form within their area of responsibility and any tropical cyclone that might move into their area of responsibility. Should the list of names for a given year prove to be insufficient, names are taken from an auxiliary list, the first 10 of which are published each year before the season starts.

As this was the fourth set of a new set of names that was implemented by PAGASA since 2001, each of the names in the main list was used for the first time (and only, in the cases of Violeta and Winnie), except for Unding, which was carried from the previous lists. Another name in the auxiliary list, Heling, was also brought from the old lists.

=== Retirement ===
The names Sudal, Tingting and Rananim were retired by the ESCAP/WMO Typhoon Committee. The names Mirinae, Lionrock and Fanapi were chosen to replace Sudal, Tingting and Rananim respectively. Tingting was retired is due to same reason as Yanyan; it was a pet name, and requested by Hong Kong.

During the season, PAGASA announced that they are going to remove the names Unding, Violeta and Winnie after the said storms caused more than 1 billion in damages or more than 300 deaths. In 2008, they were replaced with Ulysses, Vicky and Warren respectively. Although Typhoon Yoyong caused a substantial amount of damage, the name Yoyong was not retired following the season.

== Season effects ==
This is a table of the storms in 2004 and their landfalls, if any. Damage and deaths include totals while the storm was extratropical or a wave or low. The information below is mainly from the Joint Typhoon Warning Center. Names in parentheses are those assigned by PAGASA.

Name	Dates	Peak intensity			Areas affected	Damage (USD)	Deaths	Ref(s).
Name	Dates	Category	Wind speed	Pressure	Areas affected	Damage (USD)	Deaths	Ref(s).
01W (Ambo)	February 11–16	Tropical Depression	55 km/h (34 mph)	1,000 hPa (29.53 inHg)	Caroline Islands	None	None	
02W (Butchoy)	March 18–25	Tropical Depression	55 km/h (34 mph)	1,000 hPa (29.53 inHg)	Philippines	None	None	
Sudal (Cosme)	April 4–16	Very strong typhoon	165 km/h (103 mph)	940 hPa (27.76 inHg)	Caroline Islands	$14 million	None	
Nida (Dindo)	May 13–21	Very strong typhoon	175 km/h (109 mph)	935 hPa (27.61 inHg)	Caroline Islands, Philippines, Japan	$1.3 million	31	
05W	May 14–20	Tropical Depression	55 km/h (34 mph)	1,004 hPa (29.65 inHg)	Vietnam	None	None	
Omais (Enteng)	May 16–23	Severe tropical storm	95 km/h (59 mph)	985 hPa (29.09 inHg)	Caroline Islands	None	None	
Conson (Frank)	June 4–11	Strong typhoon	150 km/h (93 mph)	960 hPa (28.35 inHg)	Philippines, Taiwan, Japan	$3.8 million	30	
Chanthu (Gener)	June 8–15	Severe tropical storm	110 km/h (68 mph)	975 hPa (28.79 inHg)	Philippines, Vietnam, Cambodia, Laos, Thailand	$7.9 million	39	
Dianmu (Helen)	June 13–21	Very strong typhoon	185 km/h (115 mph)	915 hPa (27.02 inHg)	Caroline Islands, Japan	$68.5 million	6	
Mindulle (Igme)	June 21 – July 3	Very strong typhoon	175 km/h (109 mph)	940 hPa (27.76 inHg)	Mariana Islands, Philippines, Taiwan, East China, Ryukyu Islands, Korea	$833 million	56	
Tingting	June 25 – July 4	Strong typhoon	150 km/h (93 mph)	955 hPa (28.20 inHg)	Caroline Islands, Mariana Islands	$23.7 million	12	
Kompasu (Julian)	July 11–16	Tropical storm	85 km/h (53 mph)	992 hPa (29.29 inHg)	Philippines, Taiwan, South China	Unknown	None	
Namtheun	July 24 – August 3	Very strong typhoon	155 km/h (96 mph)	935 hPa (27.61 inHg)	Japan	None	None	
TD	July 27	Tropical Depression	Not specified	998 hPa (29.47 inHg)	South China	None	None	
Malou	August 2–6	Tropical storm	75 km/h (47 mph)	996 hPa (29.41 inHg)	Japan	Unknown	None	
Meranti	August 3–9	Strong typhoon	140 km/h (87 mph)	960 hPa (28.35 inHg)	Wake Island	None	None	
Rananim (Karen)	August 6–15	Strong typhoon	150 km/h (93 mph)	950 hPa (28.05 inHg)	Ryukyu Islands, East China, Taiwan	$2.44 billion	169	
TD	August 6–7	Tropical Depression	Not specified	1,002 hPa (29.59 inHg)	None	None	None	
TD	August 7–8	Tropical Depression	Not specified	1,002 hPa (29.59 inHg)	None	None	None	
Malakas	August 9–13	Tropical storm	85 km/h (53 mph)	990 hPa (29.23 inHg)	None	Unknown	None	
Megi (Lawin)	August 14–20	Strong typhoon	120 km/h (75 mph)	970 hPa (28.64 inHg)	Japan, Korea	Unknown	5	
Chaba	August 18–31	Violent typhoon	205 km/h (127 mph)	910 hPa (26.87 inHg)	Ryukyu Islands, South Korea, Japan	$2 billion	20	
Aere (Marce)	August 18–31	Strong typhoon	150 km/h (93 mph)	955 hPa (28.20 inHg)	Caroline Islands, Ryukyu Islands, China, Taiwan	$313,000	107	
21W	August 25–30	Tropical Depression	55 km/h (34 mph)	1,000 hPa (29.53 inHg)	Mariana Islands	None	None	
Songda (Nina)	August 26 – September 7	Very strong typhoon	175 km/h (109 mph)	925 hPa (27.32 inHg)	Marshall Islands, Mariana Islands, Japan, South Korea	$9.3 billion	28	
Sarika	September 3–9	Severe tropical storm	100 km/h (62 mph)	980 hPa (28.94 inHg)	Mariana Islands	None	None	
TD	September 8–11	Tropical Depression	Not specified	1,002 hPa (29.59 inHg)	Ryukyu Islands	None	None	
Haima (Ofel)	September 10–13	Tropical storm	75 km/h (47 mph)	996 hPa (29.41 inHg)	Taiwan, East China	$7.64 million	None	
TD	September 12	Tropical Depression	Not specified	1,008 hPa (29.77 inHg)	Taiwan	None	None	
Pablo	September 15–20	Tropical Depression	Not specified	1,008 hPa (29.77 inHg)	Philippines, Vietnam	None	None	
TD	September 15–16	Tropical Depression	Not specified	1,006 hPa (29.71 inHg)	East China	None	None	
Meari (Quinta)	September 19–29	Very strong typhoon	165 km/h (103 mph)	940 hPa (27.76 inHg)	Caroline Islands, Japan	$798 million	18	
TD	September 20	Tropical Depression	Not specified	1,008 hPa (29.77 inHg)	None	None	None	
Ma-on (Rolly)	October 3–10	Very strong typhoon	185 km/h (115 mph)	920 hPa (27.17 inHg)	Japan	$623 million	7	
TD	October 4	Tropical Depression	Not specified	1,004 hPa (29.65 inHg)	None	None	None	
TD	October 9–13	Tropical Depression	Not specified	1,004 hPa (29.65 inHg)	None	None	None	
Tokage (Siony)	October 12–20	Very strong typhoon	155 km/h (96 mph)	940 hPa (27.76 inHg)	Mariana Islands, Taiwan, Japan	$2.3 billion	95	
Nock-ten (Tonyo)	October 14–26	Very strong typhoon	155 km/h (96 mph)	945 hPa (27.91 inHg)	Caroline Islands, Mariana Islands, Taiwan, Ryukyu Islands	None	3	
Muifa (Unding)	November 14–25	Strong typhoon	150 km/h (93 mph)	950 hPa (28.05 inHg)	Philippines, Vietnam, Thailand, Malaysia, Myanmar	$18 million	108	
TD	November 16–19	Tropical Depression	Not specified	1,006 hPa (29.71 inHg)	None	None	None	
Merbok (Violeta)	November 22–23	Tropical storm	65 km/h (40 mph)	1,000 hPa (29.53 inHg)	Philippines	$253 million	31	
Winnie	November 29–30	Tropical Depression	Not specified	1,002 hPa (29.59 inHg)	Philippines	$14.6 million	1,593	
Nanmadol (Yoyong)	November 28 – December 4	Very strong typhoon	165 km/h (103 mph)	935 hPa (27.61 inHg)	Caroline Islands, Philippines, Taiwan	$60.8 million	77	
Talas (Zosimo)	December 9–20	Tropical storm	75 km/h (47 mph)	994 hPa (29.35 inHg)	Marshall Islands, Caroline Islands	$750,000	None	
Noru	December 17–21	Tropical storm	75 km/h (47 mph)	990 hPa (29.23 inHg)	Mariana Islands	None	None	
Season aggregates
45 systems	February 11 – December 21		205 km/h (127 mph)	910 hPa (26.87 inHg)		$18.8 billion	2,435	

== See also ==
- Tropical cyclones in 2004
- List of Pacific typhoon seasons
- List of wettest tropical cyclones
- 2004 Pacific hurricane season
- 2004 Atlantic hurricane season
- 2004 North Indian Ocean cyclone season
- South-West Indian Ocean cyclone seasons: 2003–04, 2004–05
- Australian region cyclone seasons: 2003–04, 2004–05
- South Pacific cyclone seasons: 2003–04, 2004–05
