= Typhoon =

Regional tropical cyclone

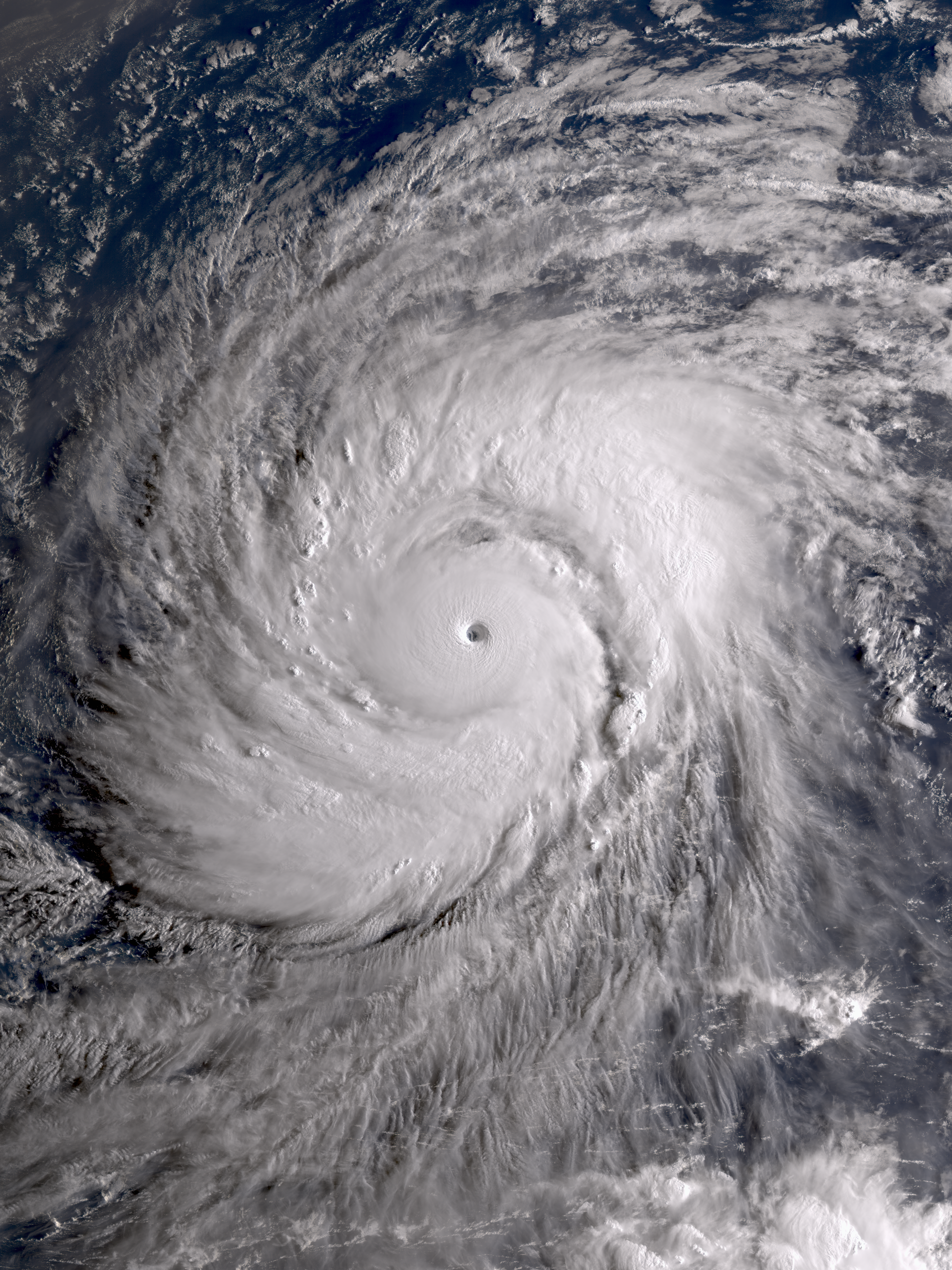
Typhoon Sinlaku (2026) approaching Guam with maximum sustained winds.

A typhoon is a tropical cyclone which produces sustained hurricane-force winds of at least 119 km/h (74 mph). This region is referred to as the Northwestern Pacific Basin, accounting for almost one third of the world's tropical cyclones. For organizational purposes, the northern Pacific Ocean is divided into three regions: the eastern (North America to 140°W), central (140°W to 180°), and western (180° to 100°E). The Regional Specialized Meteorological Center (RSMC) for tropical cyclone forecasts is in Japan, with other tropical cyclone warning centres for the northwest Pacific in Hawaii (the Joint Typhoon Warning Center), the Philippines, and Hong Kong. Although the RSMC names each system, the main name list itself is coordinated among 18 countries that have territories threatened by typhoons each year.

Within most of the northwestern Pacific, there are no official typhoon seasons as tropical cyclones form throughout the year. However, Vietnam recognises its typhoon season as lasting from the beginning of June through to the end of November, with an average of four to six typhoons hitting the country annually. Like any tropical cyclone, there are several main requirements for typhoon formation and development. It must be in sufficiently warm sea surface temperatures, atmospheric instability, high humidity in the lower-to-middle levels of the troposphere, have enough Coriolis effect to develop a low pressure centre, a pre-existing low level focus or disturbance, and a low vertical wind shear. Although the majority of storms form between June and November, a few storms may occur between December and May (although tropical cyclone formation is very rare during that time). On average, the northwestern Pacific features the most numerous and intense tropical cyclones globally. Like other basins, they are steered by the subtropical ridge towards the west or northwest, with some systems recurving near and east of Japan. The Philippines receive the brunt of the landfalls, with China and Japan being less often impacted. However, some of the deadliest typhoons in history have struck China. Southern China has the longest record of typhoon impacts for the region, with a thousand-year sample via documents within their archives. Taiwan has received the wettest known typhoon on record for the northwest Pacific tropical cyclone basins.

According to the statistics of the Joint Typhoon Warning Center, from 1950 to 2022, the Northwest Pacific generated an average of 26.5 named tropical cyclones each year, of which an average of 16.6 reached typhoon standard or above as defined by the Joint Typhoon Warning Center.

== Nomenclature ==
=== Etymology ===
The etymology of typhoon is either of Chinese or Persian-Hindustani origin.

Typhoon may trace to 風癡 (meaning "winds which last long"), first attested in 1124 in China. It was pronounced [hɔŋ tsʰi] in Hokkien Chinese at the time, but later evolved to [hɔŋ tʰai]. New characters 風颱 were created to match the sound, no later than 1566. The word was introduced to Mandarin Chinese in the inverted Mandarin order 颱風 and pronounced [tʰaɪ fɤŋ], later picked up by foreign sailors to appear as typhoon. The usage of 颱風 was not dominant until Chu Coching, the head of meteorology of the national academy from 1929 to 1936, declared it to be the standard term. There were 29 alternative terms for typhoon recorded in a chronicle in 1762, now mostly replaced by 颱風, although 風癡 or 風颱 continues to be used in Min Chinese- and Wu Chinese- speaking areas from Chaozhou, Guangdong to Taizhou, Zhejiang.

Some English linguists proposed the English word typhoon traced to the Cantonese pronunciation of 颱風 [tʰɔi fuŋ] (corresponding to Mandarin [tʰaɪ fɤŋ]), in turn the Cantonese word traced to Arabic. This claim contradicts the fact that the Cantonese term for typhoon was 風舊 [fuŋ kɐu] before the national promotion of 颱風. 風舊 (meaning "winds which last long") was first attested in 280, being the oldest Chinese term for typhoon. Not one Chinese historical record links 颱風 to an Arabic or foreign origin. On the other hand, Chinese records consistently assert that foreigners refer to typhoons as "black wind". "Black wind" eventually entered the vocabulary of Jin Chinese as 黑老風 [xəʔ lo fəŋ].

Alternatively, some dictionaries propose that typhoon derived from (طوفان) tūfān, meaning storm in Persian and Hindustani. The root of (طوفان) tūfān possibly traces to the Ancient Greek mythological creature Typhôn. In French typhon was attested as storm in 1504. Portuguese traveler Fernão Mendes Pinto referred to a tufão in his memoir published in 1614. The earliest form in English was "touffon" (1588), later as touffon, tuffon, tufon, tuffin, tuffoon, tayfun, tiffoon, typhawn.

=== Intensity classifications ===
RSMC Tokyo's Tropical Cyclone Intensity Scale
Category	Sustained winds
Violent Typhoon	≥105 knots ≥194 km/h
Very Strong Typhoon	85–104 knots 157–193 km/h
Typhoon	64–84 knots 118–156 km/h
Severe Tropical Storm	48–63 knots 89–117 km/h
Tropical Storm	34–47 knots 62–88 km/h
Tropical Depression	≤33 knots ≤61 km/h

A tropical depression is the lowest category that the Japan Meteorological Agency uses and is the term used for a tropical system that has wind speeds not exceeding 33 knots (38 mph; 61 km/h). A tropical depression is upgraded to a tropical storm should its sustained wind speeds exceed 34 knots (39 mph; 63 km/h). Tropical storms also receive official names from RSMC Tokyo. Should the storm intensify further and reach sustained wind speeds of 48 knots (55 mph; 89 km/h) then it will be classified as a severe tropical storm. Once the system's maximum sustained winds reach wind speeds of 64 knots (74 mph; 119 km/h), the JMA will designate the tropical cyclone as a typhoon—the highest category on its scale.

Since 2009 the Hong Kong Observatory has divided typhoons into three different classifications: typhoon, severe typhoon and super typhoon. A typhoon has wind speed of 64–79 kn (74–91 mph; 119–146 km/h), a severe typhoon has winds of at least 80 knots (92 mph; 150 km/h), and a super typhoon has winds of at least 100 knots (120 mph; 190 km/h). The United States' Joint Typhoon Warning Center (JTWC) classifies typhoons with wind speeds of at least 130 knots (150 mph; 240 km/h)—the equivalent of a strong Category 4 storm in the Saffir-Simpson scale—as super typhoons. However, the maximum sustained wind speed measurements that the JTWC uses are based on a 1-minute averaging period, akin to the U.S.'s National Hurricane Center and Central Pacific Hurricane Center. As a result, the JTWC's wind reports are higher than JMA's measurements, as the latter is based on a 10-minute averaging interval.

== Genesis ==
There are six main requirements for tropical cyclogenesis: sufficiently warm sea surface temperatures, atmospheric instability, high humidity in the lower to middle levels of the troposphere, enough Coriolis force to develop a low pressure center, a pre-existing low level focus or disturbance, and low vertical wind shear. While these conditions are necessary for tropical cyclone formation, they do not guarantee that a tropical cyclone will form. Normally, an ocean temperature of 26.5 °C (79.7 °F) spanning through a depth of at least 50 metres (160 ft) is considered the minimum to maintain the special mesocyclone that is the tropical cyclone. These warm waters are needed to maintain the warm core that fuels tropical systems. A minimum distance of 500 km (310 mi) from the equator is normally needed for tropical cyclogenesis. Whether it be a depression in the Intertropical Convergence Zone (ITCZ) or monsoon trough, a broad surface front, or an outflow boundary, a low level feature with sufficient vorticity and convergence is required to begin tropical cyclogenesis. About 85 to 90 percent of Pacific typhoons form within the monsoon trough. Even with perfect upper-level conditions and the required atmospheric instability, the lack of a surface focus will prevent the development of organized convection and a surface low. Vertical wind shear of less than 10 metres per second (19 knots; 33 feet per second) between the ocean surface and the tropopause is required for tropical cyclone development. Typically with Pacific typhoons, there are two jets of outflow: one to the north ahead of an upper trough in the westerlies, and a second towards the equator.

In general, the westerly wind increases associated with the Madden–Julian oscillation lead to increased tropical cyclogenesis in all tropical cyclone basins. As the oscillation propagates from west to east, it leads to an eastward march in tropical cyclogenesis with time during that hemisphere's summer season. On average, twice per year twin tropical cyclones will form in the western Pacific Ocean, near the 5th parallel north and the 5th parallel south, along the same meridian, or line of longitude. There is an inverse relationship between tropical cyclone activity in the western Pacific basin and the North Atlantic basin, however. When one basin is active, the other is normally quiet, and vice versa. The main reason for this appears to be the phase of the Madden–Julian oscillation, or MJO, which is normally in opposite modes between the two basins at any given time.

== Frequency ==
Storm Frequency Tropical storms and Typhoons by month, for the period 1959–2020 (Northwest Pacific)
Month	Count	Average
Jan	29	0.5
Feb	16	0.3
Mar	28	0.5
Apr	38	0.6
May	68	1.1
Jun	108	1.7
Jul	244	3.9
Aug	348	5.6
Sep	300	4.8
Oct	246	4.0
Nov	155	2.5
Dec	73	1.2
Annual	1653	26.7
Source: JTWC

Nearly one-third of the world's tropical cyclones form within the western Pacific. This makes this basin the most active on Earth. Pacific typhoons have formed year-round, with peak months from August to October. The peak months correspond to that of the Atlantic hurricane seasons. Along with a high storm frequency, this basin also features the most globally intense storms on record. One of the most recent busy seasons was 2013. Tropical cyclones form in any month of the year across the northwest Pacific Ocean and concentrate around June and November in the northern Indian Ocean. The area just northeast of the Philippines is the most active place on Earth for tropical cyclones to exist.

Across the Philippines themselves, activity reaches a minimum in February, before increasing steadily through June and spiking from July through October, with September being the most active month for tropical cyclones across the archipelago. Activity falls off significantly in November, although Typhoon Haiyan, the strongest Philippine typhoon on record, was a November typhoon. The most frequently impacted areas of the Philippines by tropical cyclones are northern and central Luzon and eastern Visayas. A ten-year average of satellite determined precipitation showed that at least 30 percent of the annual rainfall in the northern Philippines could be traced to tropical cyclones, while the southern islands receive less than 10 percent of their annual rainfall from tropical cyclones. The genesis and intensity of typhoons are also modulated by slow variation of the sea surface temperature and circulation features following a near-10-year frequency.

== Paths ==
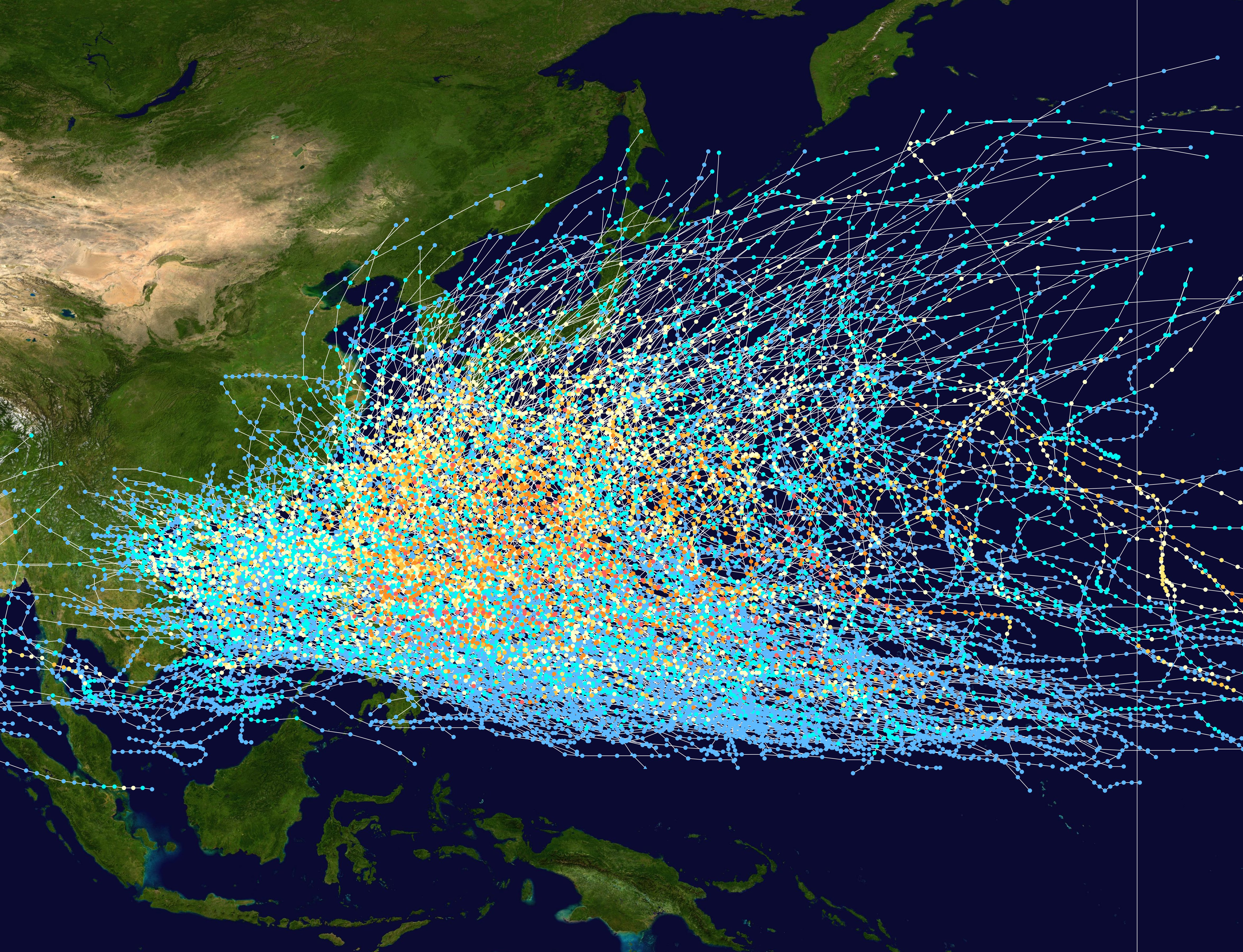
Tracks of all tropical cyclones in the northwestern Pacific Ocean between 1980 and 2005. The vertical line to the right is the International Date Line.

Cumulative track map of all tropical cyclones in the northwestern Pacific Ocean from 1951 to 2026, containing theJapan Metrological Agency's tropical cyclone intensity scale.

Most tropical cyclones form on the side of the subtropical ridge closer to the equator, then move poleward past the ridge axis before recurving north and northeast into the main belt of the westerlies. Most typhoons form in a region in the northwest Pacific known as typhoon alley, where the planet's most powerful tropical cyclones most frequently develop. When the subtropical ridge shifts due to El Niño, so will the preferred tropical cyclone tracks. Areas west of Japan and Korea tend to experience many fewer September–November tropical cyclone impacts during El Niño and neutral years. During El Niño years, the break in the subtropical ridge tends to lie near 130°E, which would favor the Japanese archipelago. During La Niña years, the formation of tropical cyclones, and the subtropical ridge position, shift westward across the western Pacific Ocean, which increases the landfall threat to China and greater intensity to Philippines. Those that form near the Marshall Islands find their way to Jeju Island, Korea. Typhoon paths follow three general directions.

- Straight track (or straight runner). A general westward path affects the Philippines, southern China, Taiwan, and Vietnam.
- A parabolic recurving track. Storms recurving affect the eastern Philippines, eastern China, Taiwan, Korea, Japan, and the Russian Far East.
- Northward track. From point of origin, the storm follows a northerly direction, only affecting small islands.

A rare few storms, like Hurricane John, are redesignated as typhoons as they originated in the Eastern/Central Pacific and moved into the western Pacific.

== Basin monitoring ==
Within the Western Pacific, RSMC Tokyo-Typhoon Center, part of the Japan Meteorological Agency, has had the official warning responsibility for the whole of the Western Pacific since 1989, and the naming responsibility for systems of tropical storm strength or greater since 2000. However each National Meteorological and Hydrological Service within the western Pacific has the responsibility for issuing warnings for land areas about tropical cyclones affecting their country, such as the Joint Typhoon Warning Center for United States agencies, the Philippine Atmospheric, Geophysical and Astronomical Services Administration (PAGASA) for interests in the island archipelago nation, and the Hong Kong Observatory for storms that come close enough to cause the issuance of warning signals.

=== Name sources and name list ===
The list of names consists of entries from 14 southeast and east Asian nations and regions and the United States who have territories directly affected by typhoons. The submitted names are arranged into a list, the names on the list will be used from up to down, from left to right. When all names on the list are used, it will start again from the left-top corner. When a typhoon causes damage in a region, the affected region can request for retiring the name in the next session of the ESCAP/WMO Typhoon Committee. A new name will be decided by the region whose name was retired.

Unlike tropical cyclones in other parts of the world, typhoons are not named after people. Instead, they generally refer to animals, flowers, astrological signs, and a few personal names. However, Philippines (PAGASA) retains its own naming list, which consists of both human names and other objects. Japan and some other East Asian countries also assign numbers to typhoons.

Storms that cross the date line from the central Pacific retain their original name, but the designation of hurricane becomes typhoon.

List of Western Pacific tropical cyclone names (as of 2026)
List	Contributing nations/regions													
List	Cambodia	China	North Korea	Hong Kong	Japan	Laos	Macau	Malaysia	Federated States of Micronesia	Philippines	South Korea	Thailand	United States	Vietnam
1	Damrey	Tianma	Kirogi	Yun-yeung	Koinu	Bolaven	Sanba	Jelawat	Tirou	Maliksi	Gaemi	Prapiroon	Maria	Son-Tinh
1	Ampil	Wukong	Jongdari	Shanshan	Tomo	Leepi	Bebinca	Pulasan	Soulik	Cimaron	Narae	Burapha	Barijat	Hoaban
2	Koki	Yinxing	Gaeguri	Dim-sum	Hebi	Pabuk	Wutip	Sepat	Mun	Danas	Nari	Wipha	Francisco	Co-May
2	Krosa	Bailu	Podul	Lingling	Kajiki	Nongfa	Peipah	Tapah	Mitag	Ragasa	Neoguri	Bualoi	Matmo	Halong
3	Nakri	Fengshen	Kalmaegi	Fung-wong	Koto	Nokaen	Penha	Nuri	Sinlaku	Hagupit	Jangmi	Mekkhala	Higos	Bavi
3	Maysak	Haishen	Noul	Dolphin	Kujira	Chan-hom	Peilou	Nangka	Saudel	Narra	Gaenari	Atsani	Etau	Bang-Lang
4	Krovanh	Dujuan	Surigae	Choi-wan	Koguma	Champi	In-fa	Cempaka	Nepartak	Lupit	Mirinae	Nida	Omais	Luc-Binh
4	Chanthu	Dianmu	Mindulle	Lionrock	Tokei	Namtheun	Malou	Nyatoh	Sarbul	Amuyao	Gosari	Chaba	Aere	Songda
5	Trases	Mulan	Meari	Tsing-ma	Tokage	Ong-mang	Muifa	Merbok	Nanmadol	Talas	Hodu	Kulap	Roke	Sonca
5	Nesat	Haitang	Jamjari	Banyan	Yamaneko	Pakhar	Sanvu	Mawar	Guchol	Talim	Bori	Khanun	Lan	Saobien

== Records ==
Total storms	Year	Tropical storms	Typhoons	Super typhoons
39	1964	13	19	7
35	1965; 1967; 1971	14; 15; 11	10; 16; 16	11; 4; 4
34	1994	14	14	6
33	1996	12	15	6
32	1974; 2026	16; 17	16; 8	0; 7
31	1989; 1992; 2013	10; 13; 18	15; 17; 8	6; 5; 5
30	1962; 1966; 1972; 1990; 2004	7; 10; 8; 9; 10	17; 17; 20; 17; 13	6; 3; 2; 4; 7

The most active Western Pacific typhoon season was in 1964, when 39 storms of tropical storm strength formed. Only 16 seasons had 30 or more storms developing since reliable records began. The least activity seen in the northwest Pacific Ocean was during the 2010 Pacific typhoon season, when only 14 tropical storms and seven typhoons formed. In the Philippines, the most active season since 1945 for tropical cyclone strikes was 1993, when nineteen tropical cyclones moved through the country. There was only one tropical cyclone that moved through the Philippines in 1958. The 2004 Pacific typhoon season was the busiest for Okinawa since 1957. Within Guangdong in southern China, during the past thousand years, the most active decades for typhoon strikes were the 1660s and 1670s.

The highest reliably-estimated maximum sustained winds on record for a typhoon was that of Typhoon Haiyan at 314 km/h (195 mph) shortly before its landfall in the central Philippines on November 8, 2013. The most intense storm based on minimum pressure was Typhoon Tip in the northwestern Pacific Ocean in 1979, which reached a minimum pressure of 870 hectopascals (26 inHg) and maximum sustained wind speeds of 165 knots (190 mph; 306 km/h). The deadliest typhoon of the 20th century was Typhoon Nina, which killed nearly 100,000 in China in 1975 due to a flood that caused 12 reservoirs to fail. After Typhoon Morakot landed in Taiwan at midnight on August 8, 2009, almost the entire southern region of Taiwan (Chiayi County/Chiayi City, Tainan County/Tainan City (now merged as Tainan), Kaohsiung County/Kaohsiung City (now merged as Kaohsiung), and Pingtung County) and parts of Taitung County and Nantou County were flooded by record-breaking heavy rain. The rainfall in Pingtung County reached 2,327 millimetres (91.6 inches), breaking all rainfall records of any single place in Taiwan induced by a single typhoon, and making the cyclone the wettest known typhoon.

== See also ==
- Pacific typhoon season
- Tropical cyclones in 2026
- 2026 Pacific typhoon season
- Effects of tropical cyclones
- China tropical cyclone rainfall climatology

For storms that have affected countries in this basin:

- Tropical cyclones in Malaysia
- Tropical cyclones in Vietnam
- Typhoons in the Korean peninsula
- Typhoons in the Philippines
- Typhoons in Japan
