= Tropical cyclones in 2004 =

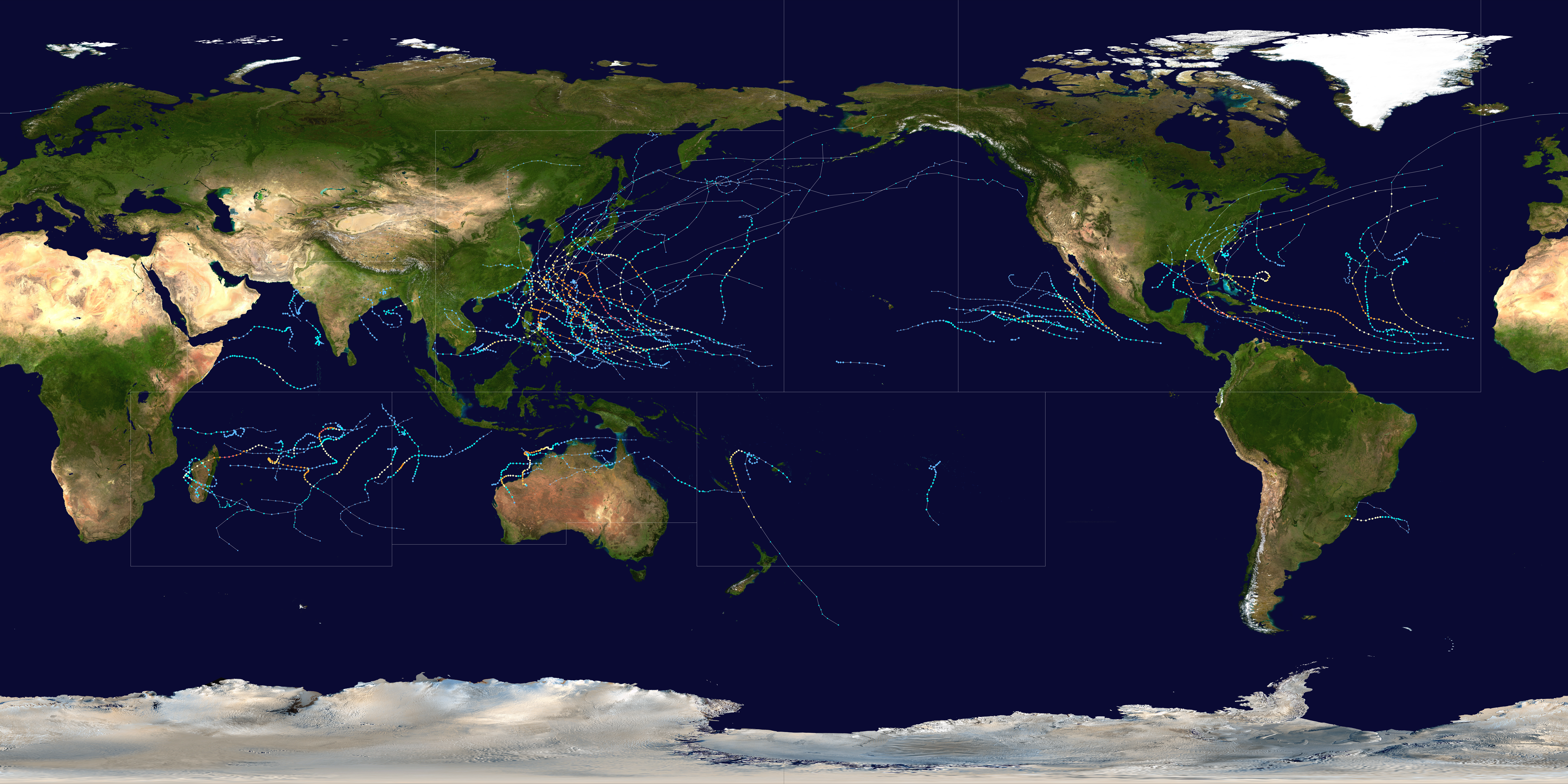
- Year summary map

Year boundaries
- First system: Heta
- Formed: December 25, 2003 (Note: According to the JTWC, Cyclone Heta developed as a tropical disturbance on December 25, 2003, and was officially named on January 2, 2004, which includes it in this list.)
- Last system: Raymond
- Dissipated: January 10, 2005

Strongest system
- Name: Gafilo
- Lowest pressure: 895 mbar (hPa); 26.43 inHg

Longest lasting system
- Name: Ivan
- Duration: 22 days

Year statistics
- Total systems: 131
- Named systems: 81
- Total fatalities: 6,609 (97)
- Total damage: $79.94 billion (2004 USD)
Related articles
- 2004 Atlantic hurricane season
- 2004 Pacific hurricane season
- 2004 Pacific typhoon season
- 2004 North Indian Ocean cyclone season
- 2003–04 South-West Indian Ocean cyclone season
- 2004–05 South-West Indian Ocean cyclone season
- 2003–04 Australian region cyclone season
- 2004–05 Australian region cyclone season
- 2003–04 South Pacific cyclone season
- 2004–05 South Pacific cyclone season

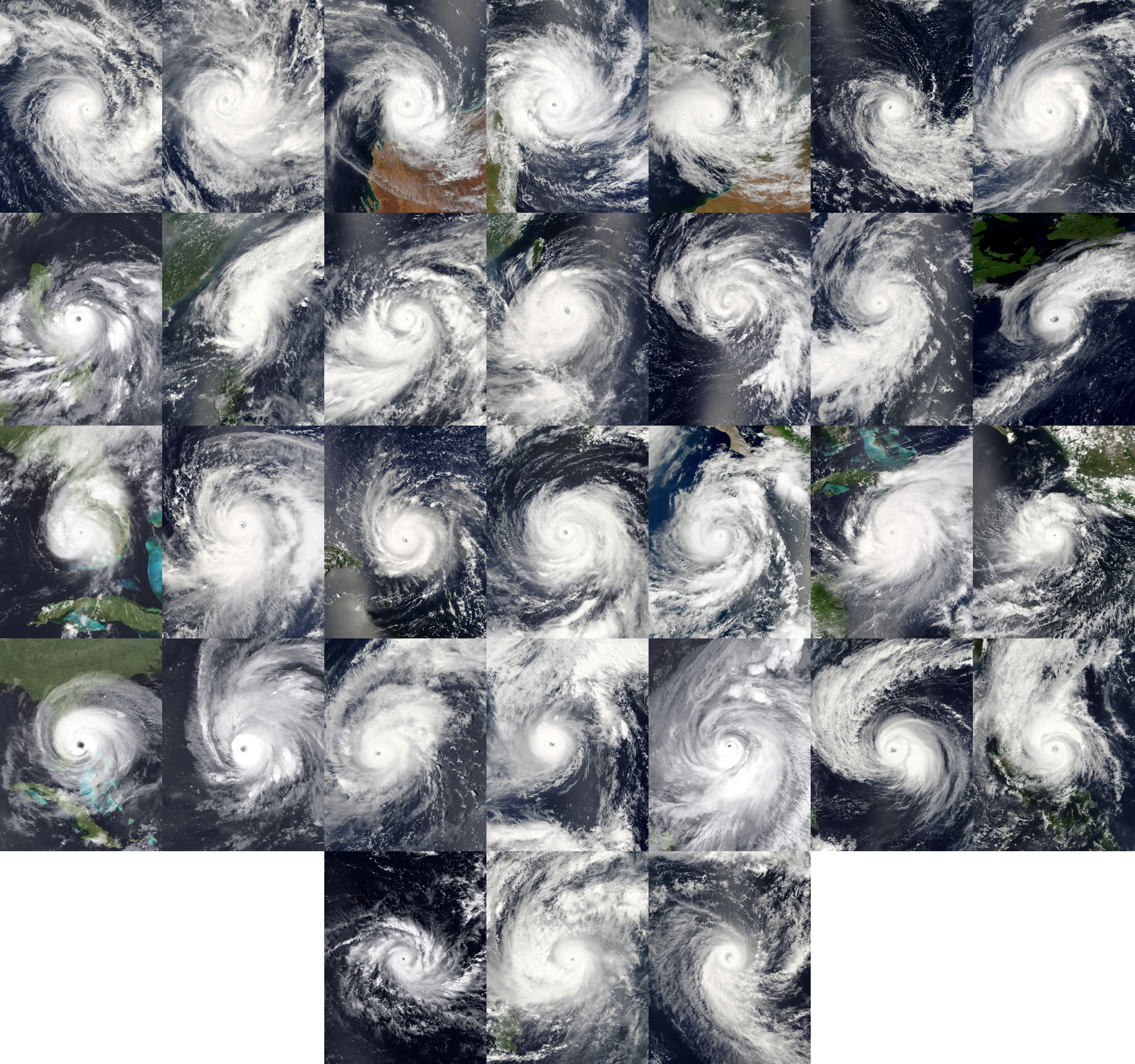
Satellite photos of the 31 tropical cyclones worldwide that reached Category 3 or higher on the Saffir–Simpson scale during 2004, from Frank in January to Chambo in December. Among them, Gafilo (center image in the first row) was the most intense, with a minimum central pressure of 895 hPa.

During 2004, tropical cyclones formed within seven different tropical cyclone basins, located within various parts of the Atlantic, Pacific and Indian Oceans. During the year, a total of 132 systems formed with 82 of these developing further and were named by the responsible warning centre. The strongest tropical cyclone of the year was Cyclone Gafilo, which was estimated to have a minimum barometric pressure of 895 hPa (26.43 inHg). The most active basin in the year was the Western Pacific, which documented 29 named systems, while the North Atlantic 15 named systems formed. Conversely, both the Eastern Pacific hurricane and North Indian Ocean cyclone seasons experienced a below average number of named systems, numbering 12 and 4, respectively. Activity across the southern hemisphere's three basins—South-West Indian, Australian, and South Pacific—was spread evenly, with each region recording seven named storms apiece. Throughout the year, 28 Category 3 tropical cyclones formed, including seven Category 5 tropical cyclones formed in the year. The accumulated cyclone energy (ACE) index for the 2004 (seven basins combined), as calculated by Colorado State University was 1024.4 units.

The costliest tropical cyclone was Hurricane Ivan, which struck Caribbean and United States in September causing a tornado outbreak, with US$26.1 billion in damage. The deadliest tropical cyclone of the year was Hurricane Jeanne who killed for at least 3,006 deaths in Haiti.

== Global atmospheric and hydrological conditions ==
Due to a Modoki El Niño – a rare type of El Niño in which unfavorable conditions are produced over the eastern Pacific instead of the Atlantic basin due to warmer sea surface temperatures farther west along the equatorial Pacific – activity was above average in North Atlantic Ocean.

== Summary ==
=== North Atlantic Ocean ===
It was an above average season in which 16 tropical cyclones formed. All but one tropical depression attained tropical storm status, and nine of these became hurricanes. Six hurricanes further intensified into major hurricanes.

== Systems ==
A total of 138 systems formed globally in the year with 60 of them causing significant damage, deaths, and/or setting records for their basin.

=== January ===
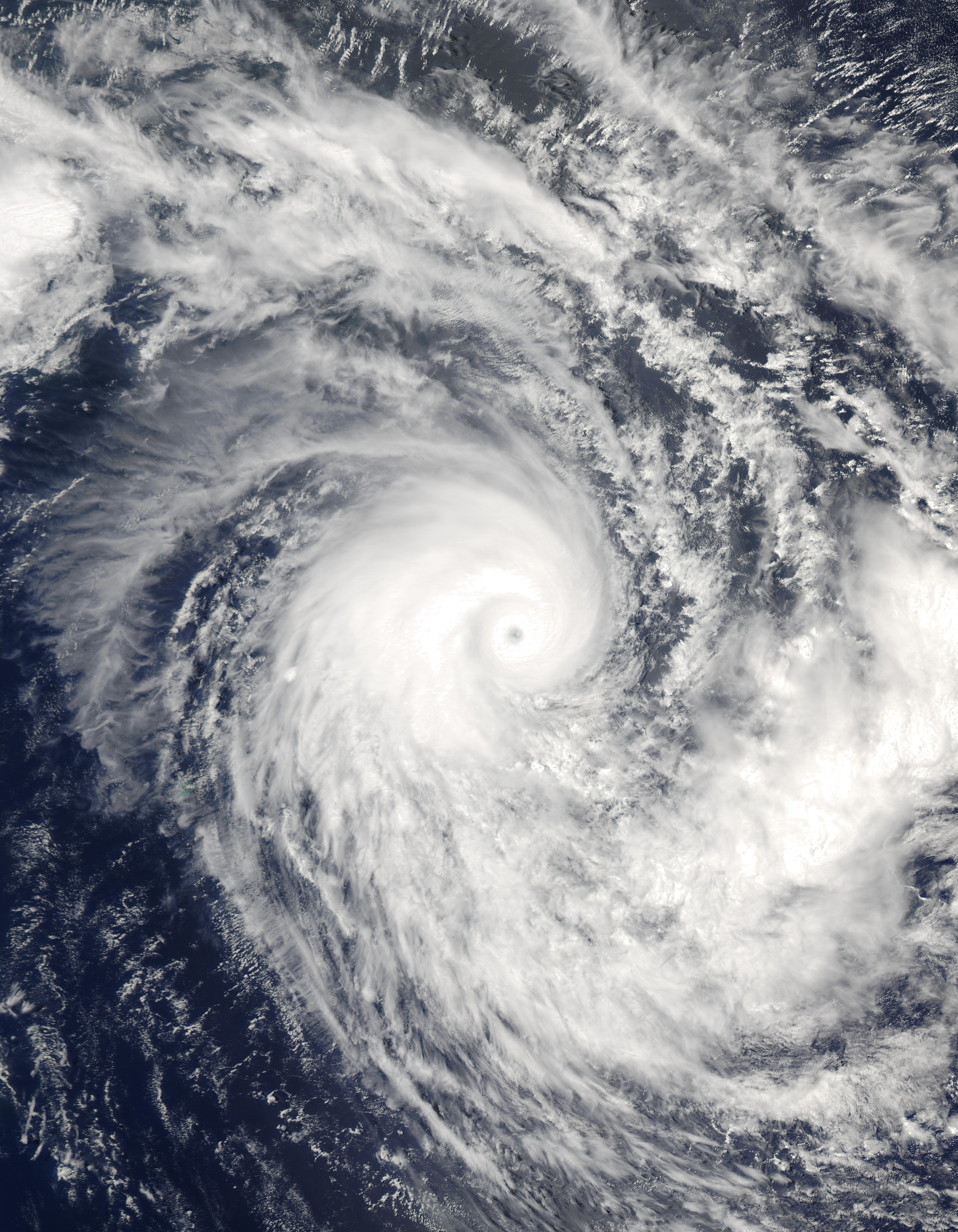
Cyclone Frank

7 storms formed on January, in the Australian and Southwestern Indian basin, respectively. Cyclone Frank was the strongest.

Tropical cyclones formed in January 2004
| Storm name | Dates active | Max wind km/h (mph) | Pressure (hPa) | Areas affected | Damage (USD) | Deaths | Refs |
|---|---|---|---|---|---|---|---|
| Heta | December 25, 2003 – January 11, 2004 | 75 (45) | 992 | Western Australia | None | None | |
| Ken | January 1–6 | 75 (45) | 992 | Western Australia | None | None | |
| Monsoon Depression | January 10–17 | N/A | N/A | Queensland, New South Wales | None | None | |
| 05R | January 22–24 | Unspecified | Unspecified | None | None | None | |
| Elita | January 24–February 4 | 120 (75) | 970 | Madagascar, Mozambique, Malawi, Seychelles, Mauritius, Réunion | $287 Million | 33 | |
| Frank | January 26–February 6 | 185 (115) | 930 | Rodrigues | None | None | |
| 08R | January 28 | Unspecified | Unspecified | None | None | None | |
| Linda | January 28–February 1 | 95 (60) | 985 | None | None | None | |

=== February ===
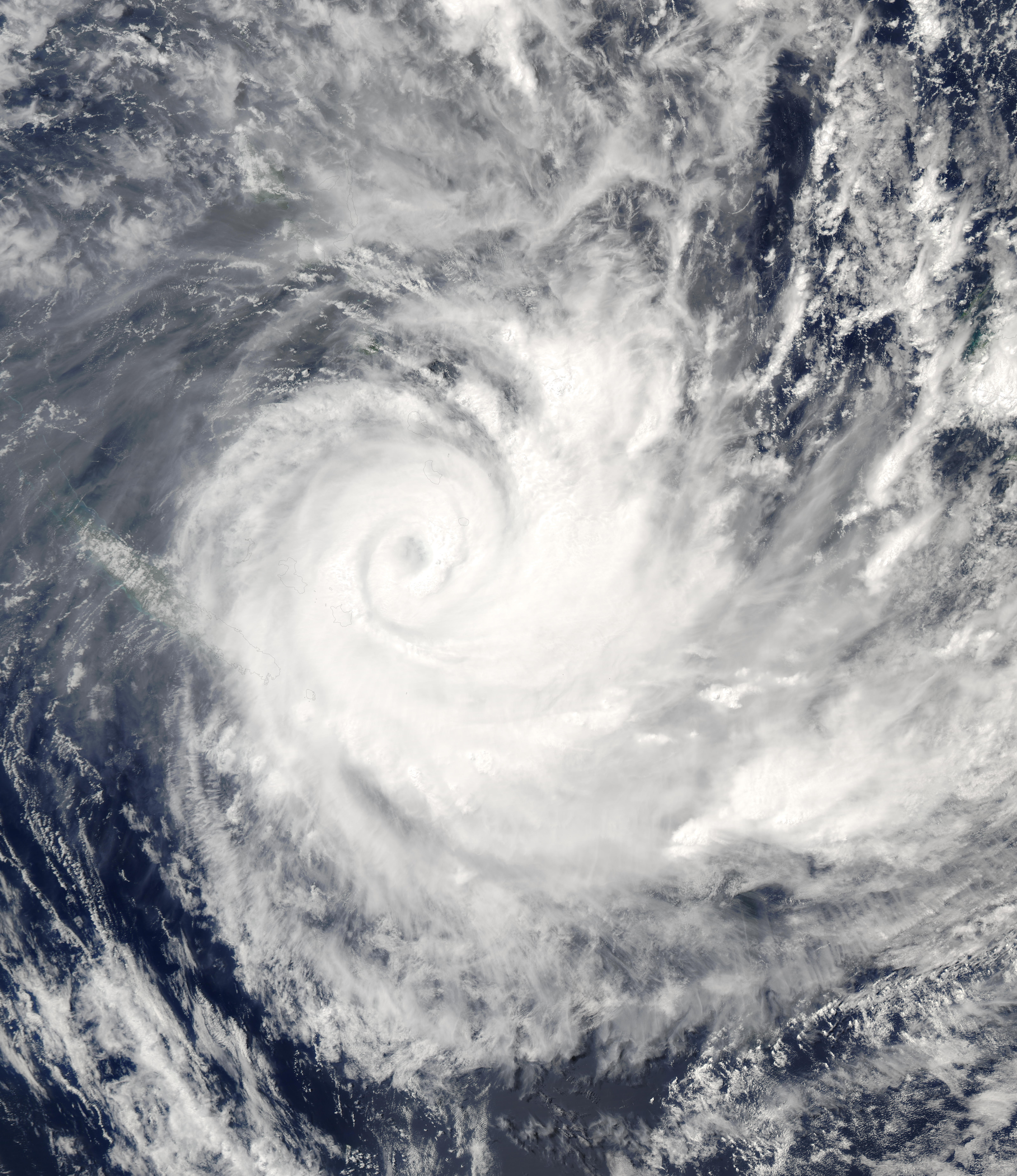
Cyclone Ivy

5 systems formed on February. 3 on Australian region, 1 on South Pacific basin, and 1 on the Western Pacific. Tropical Cyclone Ivy is the strongest.

Tropical cyclones formed in February 2004
| Storm name | Dates active | Max wind km/h (mph) | Pressure (hPa) | Areas affected | Damage (USD) | Deaths | Refs |
|---|---|---|---|---|---|---|---|
| Fritz | February 10–15 | 95 (60) | 985 | Queensland, Northern Territory | None | None | |
| 01W (Ambo) | February 11–16 | 55 (35) | 1002 | Caroline Islands | None | None | |
| Ivy | February 21–28 | 165 (105) | 935 | Vanuatu, Solomon Islands, New Caledonia, and New Zealand | $3.8 million | 4 | |
| Monty | February 25–March 3 | 185 (115) | 935 | Western Australia | Minor | None | |
| Evan | February 27–March 4 | 65 (40) | 991 | Northern Territory | None | None | |

=== March ===
March was average, 12 storms formed during the month. Out of these, the strongest storm is Cyclone Gafilo with 895 hPa. Another storm that formed during the month, Hurricane Catarina, was a record-breaking storm that became the only hurricane in the South Atlantic.

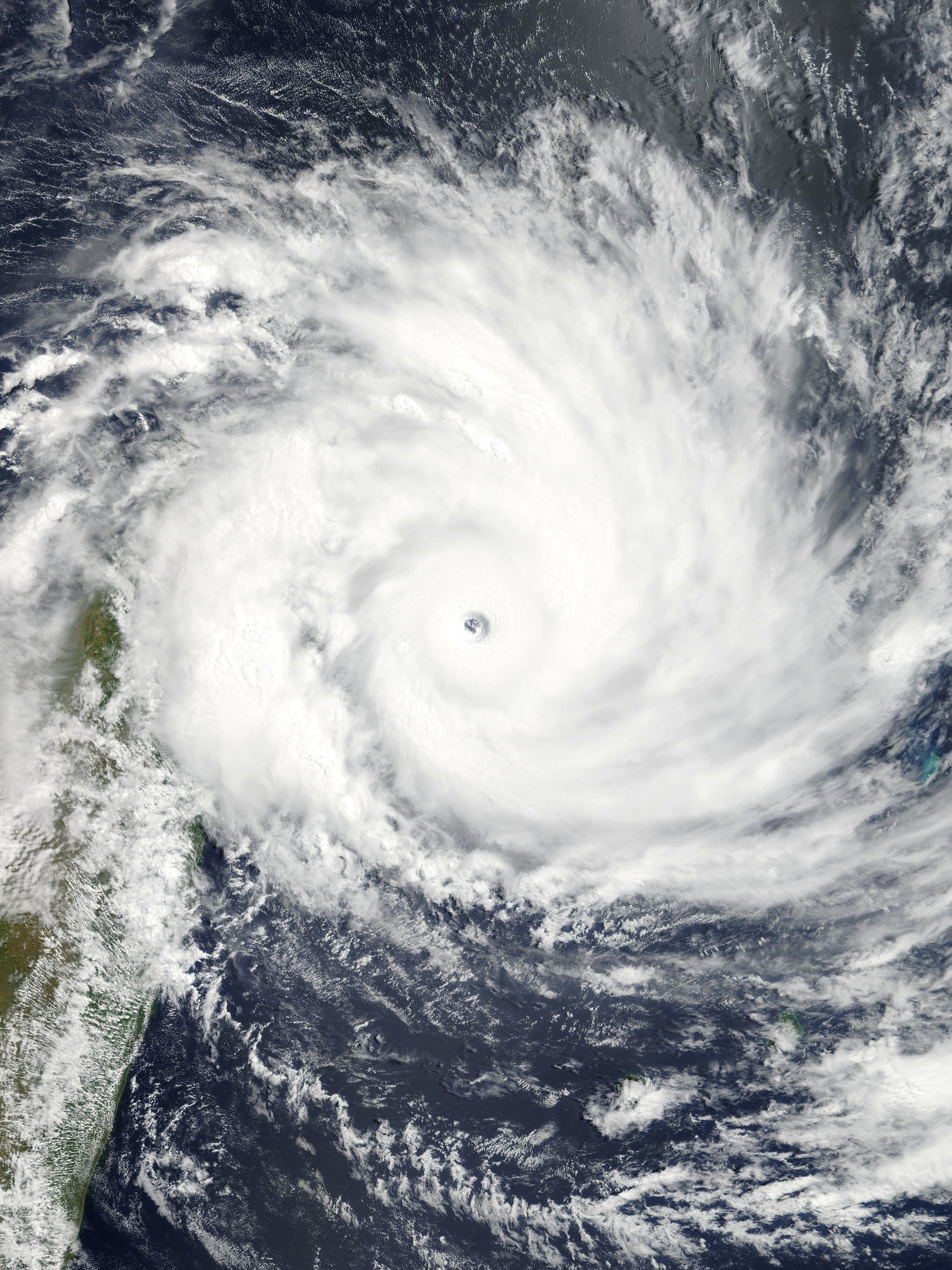
Cyclone Gafilo

Tropical cyclones formed in March 2004
| Storm name | Dates active | Max wind km/h (mph) | Pressure (hPa) | Areas affected | Damage (USD) | Deaths | Refs |
|---|---|---|---|---|---|---|---|
| Gafilo | March 1–15 | 230 (145) | 895 | Madagascar | $250 million | 363 | |
| Subtropical Storm | March 2–5 | Unspecified | Unspecified | None | None | None | |
| Nicky-Helma | March 8–16 | 110 (70) | 975 | None | None | None | |
| Fay | March 12–28 | 215 (130) | 910 | Northern Territory, Western Australia | Minimal | None | |
| 11R | March 15–28 | Unspecified | Unspecified | None | None | | |
| 02W (Butchoy) | March 18–24 | 55 (35) | 1000 | Philippines | None | None | |
| Grace | March 20–23 | 95 (60) | 985 | None | None | None | |
| 06F | March 20–22 | Unspecified | Unspecified | None | None | None | |
| Oscar–Itseng | March 21–29 | 165 (105) | 940 | None | None | None | |
| Catarina | March 24–28 | 155 (100) | 972 | Santa Catarina, Rio Grande do Sul, Southern Brazil | $350 million | 3–11 | |
| 08F | March 28–April 1 | Unspecified | Unspecified | None | None | None | |
| 13R | March 31–April 1 | Unspecified | Unspecified | None | None | None | |

=== April ===
Below average forming 9 systems. Only Typhoon Sudal became a storm, mostly being a depression.

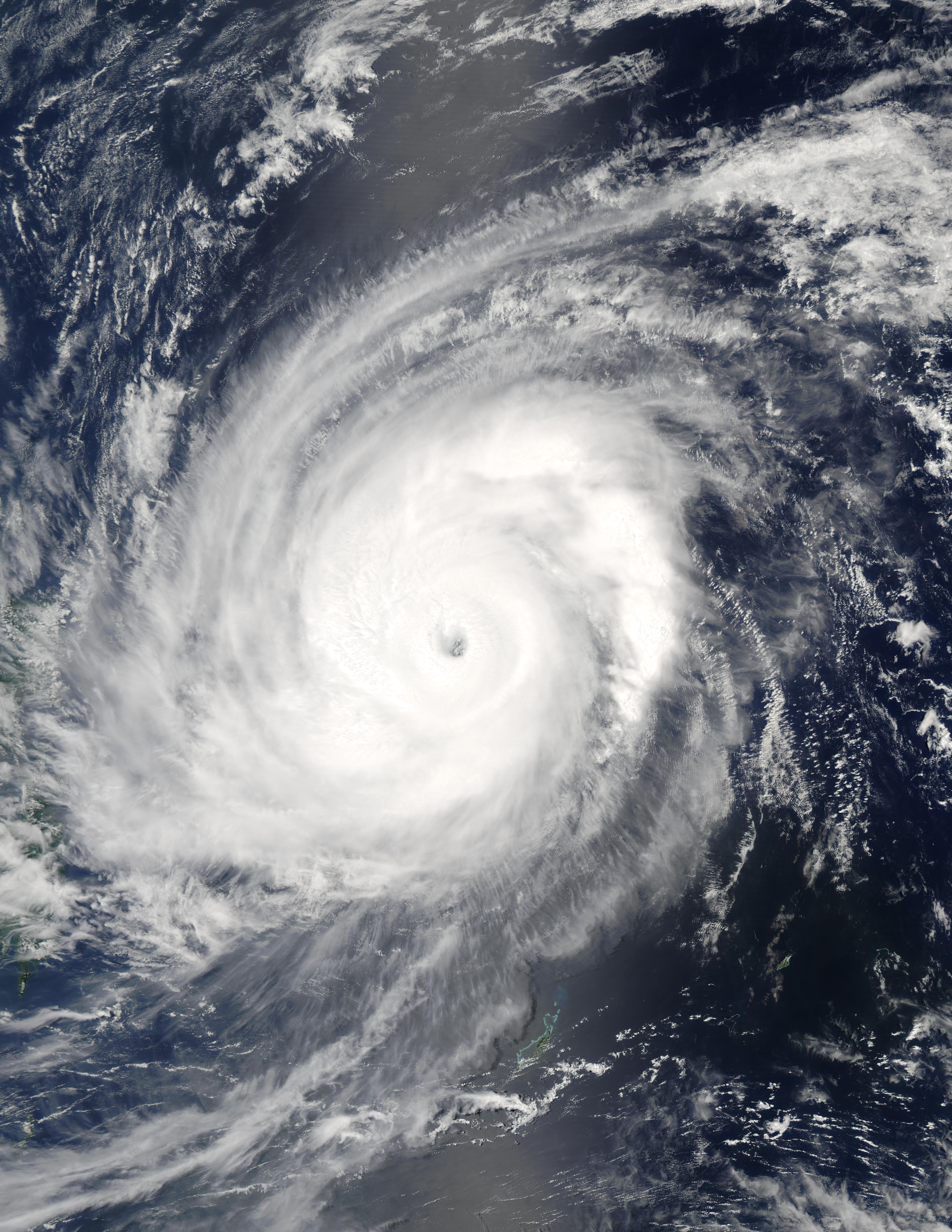
Typhoon Sudal

Tropical cyclones formed in April 2004
| Storm name | Dates active | Max wind km/h (mph) | Pressure (hPa) | Areas affected | Damage (USD) | Deaths | Refs |
|---|---|---|---|---|---|---|---|
| 09F | April 1–3 | Unspecified | Unspecified | None | None | None | |
| Sudal (Cosme) | April 4–15 | 165 (105) | 940 | Caroline Islands | $14 million | None | |
| 10F | April 4–9 | 55 (35) | 995 | Fiji | $4.17 million | 11 | |
| 11F | April 7 | Unspecified | Unspecified | None | None | None | |
| 12F | April 7–13 | Unspecified | Unspecified | Fiji | None | None | |
| 13F | April 12–13 | Unspecified | Unspecified | None | None | None | |
| 14F | April 18–19 | Unspecified | 1006 | Tonga | None | None | |
| 15F | April 21–24 | Unspecified | 1006 | None | None | None | |
| 14R | April 26–27 | Unspecified | Unspecified | None | None | None | |

=== May ===
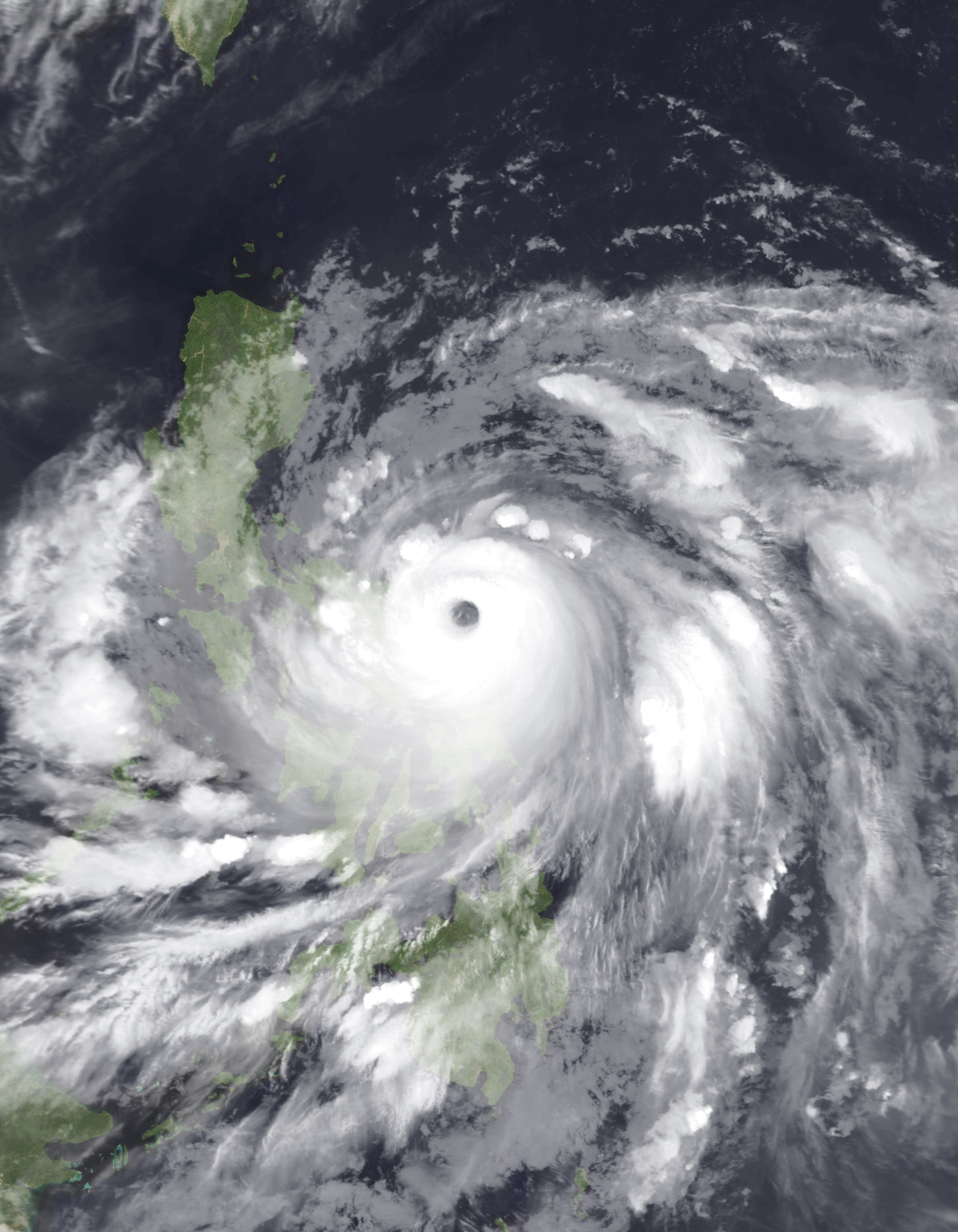
Typhoon Nida

8 systems formed on May. Typhoon Nida is the strongest.

Tropical cyclones formed in May 2004
| Storm name | Dates active | Max wind km/h (mph) | Pressure (hPa) | Areas affected | Damage (USD) | Deaths | Refs |
|---|---|---|---|---|---|---|---|
| ARB 01 | May 5–10 | 100 (65) | 984 | Kochi | $6.7 million | None | |
| Juba | May 5–17 | 100 (65) | 980 | None | None | None | |
| Nida (Dindo) | May 13–21 | 175 (115) | 935 | Caroline Islands, Philippines, Japan | $1.3 million | 31 | |
| 05W | May 14–20 | 55 (35) | 1004 | Vietnam | None | None | |
| BOB 01 | May 16–19 | 165 (105) | 952 | Odisha, Bangladesh, Myanmar, Thailand, Yunnan | $99.2 million | 236 | |
| Omais (Enteng) | May 16–22 | 95 (60) | 985 | Caroline Islands | None | None | |
| 16R | May 19–24 | Unspecified | Unspecified | None | None | None | |
| Agatha | May 22–24 | 60 (95) | 997 | None | None | None | |

=== June ===
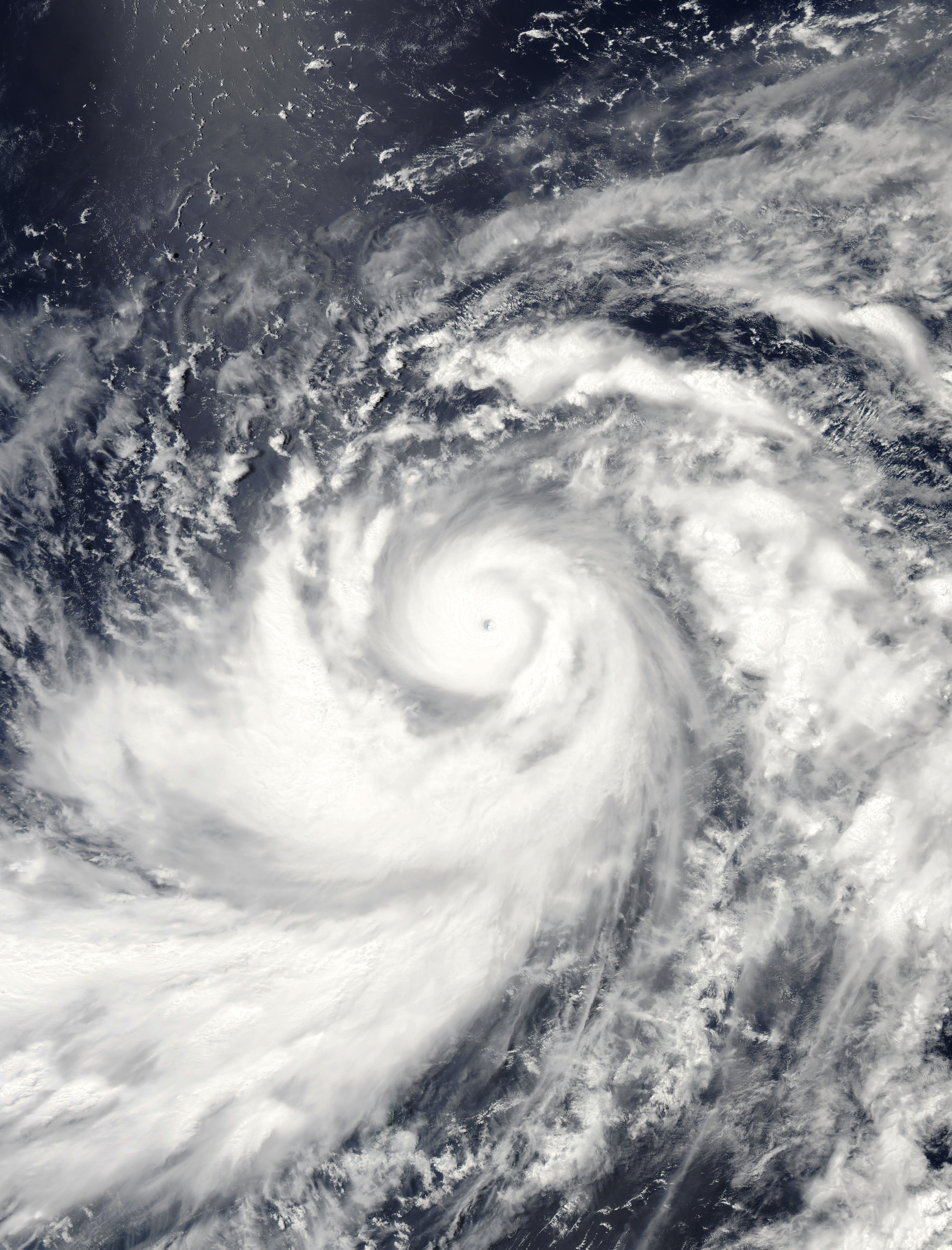
Typhoon Dianmu

7 storms formed on June. Typhoon Dianmu is the strongest.

Tropical cyclones formed in June 2004
| Storm name | Dates active | Max wind km/h (mph) | Pressure (hPa) | Areas affected | Damage (USD) | Deaths | Refs |
|---|---|---|---|---|---|---|---|
| Conson (Frank) | June 4–11 | 150 (90) | 960 | Philippines, Taiwan, Japan | $3.8 million | 30 | |
| Chanthu (Gener) | June 5–15 | 110 (70) | 975 | Philippines, Vietnam, Cambodia, Laos, Thailand | $7.9 million | 39 | |
| ARB 02 | June 10–13 | 55 (35) | 992 | Puri | None | None | |
| BOB 02 | June 11–14 | 55 (35) | 992 | None | None | None | |
| Dianmu (Helen) | June 11–21 | 185 (115) | 915 | Caroline Islands, Japan | $68.5 million | 6 | |
| Mindulle (Igme) | June 21–July 4 | 175 (110) | 940 | Mariana Islands, Philippines, Taiwan, East China, Ryukyu Islands, Korea | $833 million | 56 | |
| Tingting | June 25–July 4 | 150 (90) | 955 | Caroline Islands, Mariana Islands | $23.7 million | 12 | |

=== July ===
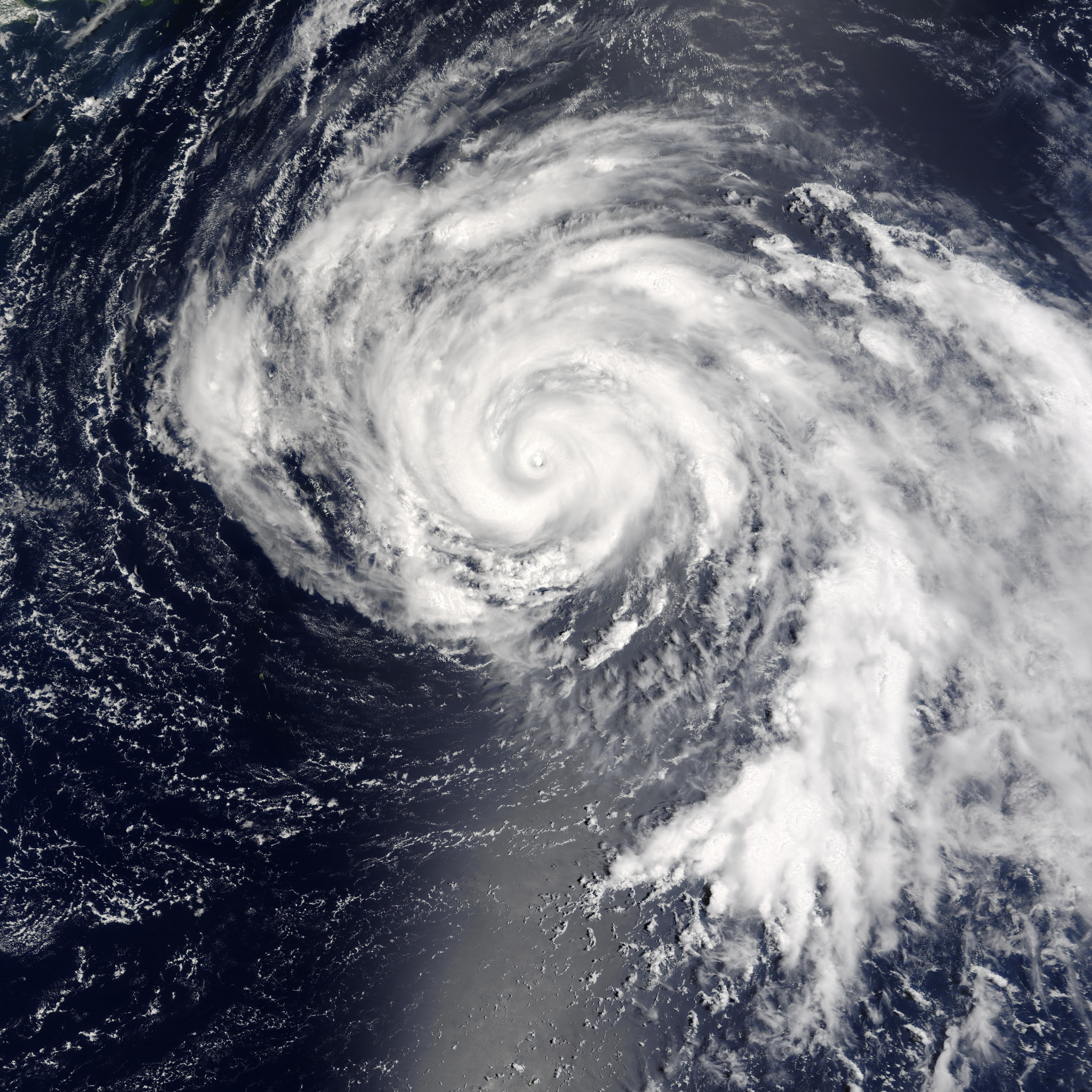
Typhoon Namtheun

Tropical cyclones formed in July 2004
| Storm name | Dates active | Max wind km/h (mph) | Pressure (hPa) | Areas affected | Damage (USD) | Deaths | Refs |
|---|---|---|---|---|---|---|---|
| Two-E | July 2–4 | 35 (55) | 1007 | None | None | None | |
| One-C | July 5–6 | 30 (45) | 1007 | None | None | None | |
| Blas | July 11–15 | 65 (100) | 991 | Northern Mexico | None | None | |
| Kompasu (Julian) | July 12–16 | 85 (50) | 992 | Philippines, Taiwan, South China | Unknown | None | |
| Celia | July 19–25 | 85 (140) | 981 | None | None | None | |
| Namtheun | July 24–August 3 | 155 (100) | 955 | Japan | None | None | |
| Darby | July 26–August 1 | 120 (195) | 957 | None | Minimal | None | |
| TD | July 27 | Unspecified | 998 | South China | None | None | |
| Alex | July 31–August 6 | 120 (195) | 957 | Southeastern United States, Atlantic Canada | $7.5 million | 1 | |

=== August ===
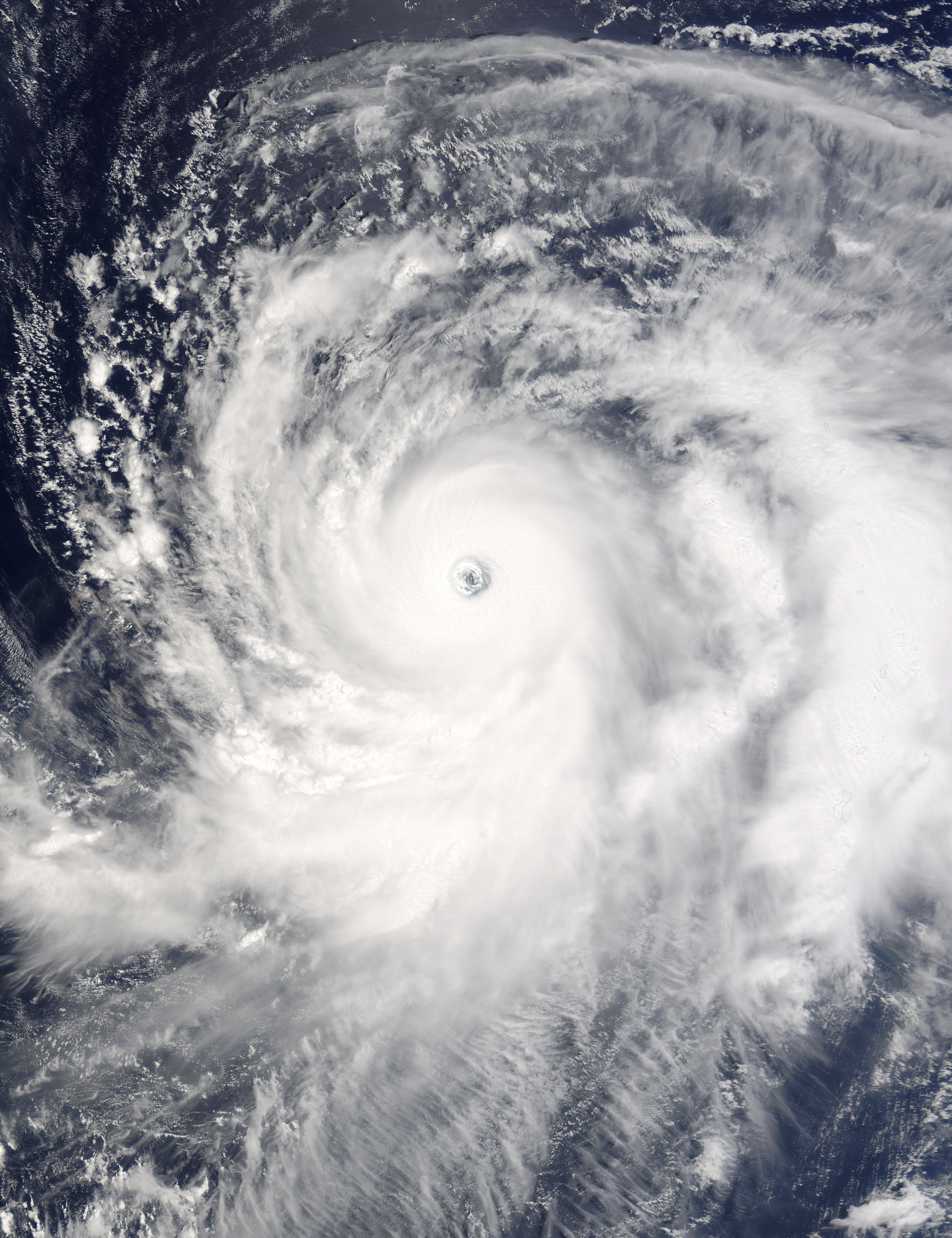
Typhoon Chaba

Tropical cyclones formed in August 2004
| Storm name | Dates active | Max wind km/h (mph) | Pressure (hPa) | Areas affected | Damage (USD) | Deaths | Refs |
|---|---|---|---|---|---|---|---|
| Six-E | August 1–2 | 30 (45) | 1008 | None | None | None | |
| Bonnie | August 3–14 | 65 (100) | 1001 | Lesser Antilles, Greater Antilles, Yucatán Peninsula, Southeastern United States (Florida), Mid-Atlantic states, New England, Atlantic Canada | $1.27 million | 3 (1) | |
| Malou | August 2–6 | 75 (45) | 996 | Japan | Unknown | None | |
| Meranti | August 2–9 | 140 (85) | 960 | Wake Island | None | None | |
| Rananim (Karen) | August 6–15 | 150 (90) | 950 | Ryukyu Islands, East China, Taiwan | $2.44 billion | 169 | |
| TD | August 6–7 | Unspecified | 1002 | None | None | None | |
| TD | August 7–8 | Unspecified | 1002 | None | None | None | |
| Malakas | August 9–13 | 85 (50) | 990 | None | Unknown | None | |
| Charley | August 9–14 | 150 (240) | 941 | Lesser Antilles, Greater Antilles (Cuba), East Coast of the United States (Florida) | $16.9 billion | 15 (20) | |
| Danielle | August 13–21 | 110 (175) | 964 | Cape Verde | None | None | |
| Earl | August 13–15 | 50 (85) | 1009 | Windward Islands | None | 1 | |
| Megi (Lawin) | August 14–20 | 120 (75) | 970 | Japan, Korea | Unknown | 5 | |
| Chaba | August 17–31 | 205 (125) | 910 | Ryukyu Islands, South Korea, Japan | $977 million | 20 | |
| Aere (Marce) | August 18–31 | 150 (90) | 955 | Caroline Islands, Ryukyu Islands, China, Taiwan | $313 thousand | 107 | |
| Estelle | August 19–24 | 70 (110) | 989 | None | None | None | |
| Frank | August 23–26 | 70 (110) | 979 | Baja California Peninsula | None | None | |
| Nine-E | August 23–26 | 35 (55) | 1005 | None | None | None | |
| Frances | August 24–September 7 | 145 (230) | 935 | (The Bahamas), Southern United States, Midwestern United States, Mid-Atlantic states, New England, Atlantic Canada | $10.1 billion | 7 (42) | |
| 21W | August 25–31 | 55 (35) | 1000 | Mariana Islands | None | None | |
| Georgette | August 26–30 | 65 (100) | 995 | None | None | None | |
| Songda (Nina) | August 26–September 8 | 175 (110) | 925 | Marshall Islands, Mariana Islands, Japan, South Korea | $9 billion | 28 | |
| Gaston | August 27–September 1 | 75 (120) | 985 | The Carolinas (South Carolina), Mid-Atlantic states, New England, Atlantic Canada | $130 million | 8 (1) | |
| Hermine | August 27–30 | 60 (95) | 1002 | New England (Massachusetts), Atlantic Canada | Minimal | None | |
| Howard | August 30–September 5 | 140 (220) | 943 | Baja California Peninsula, Western United States | Minimal | None | |

=== September ===
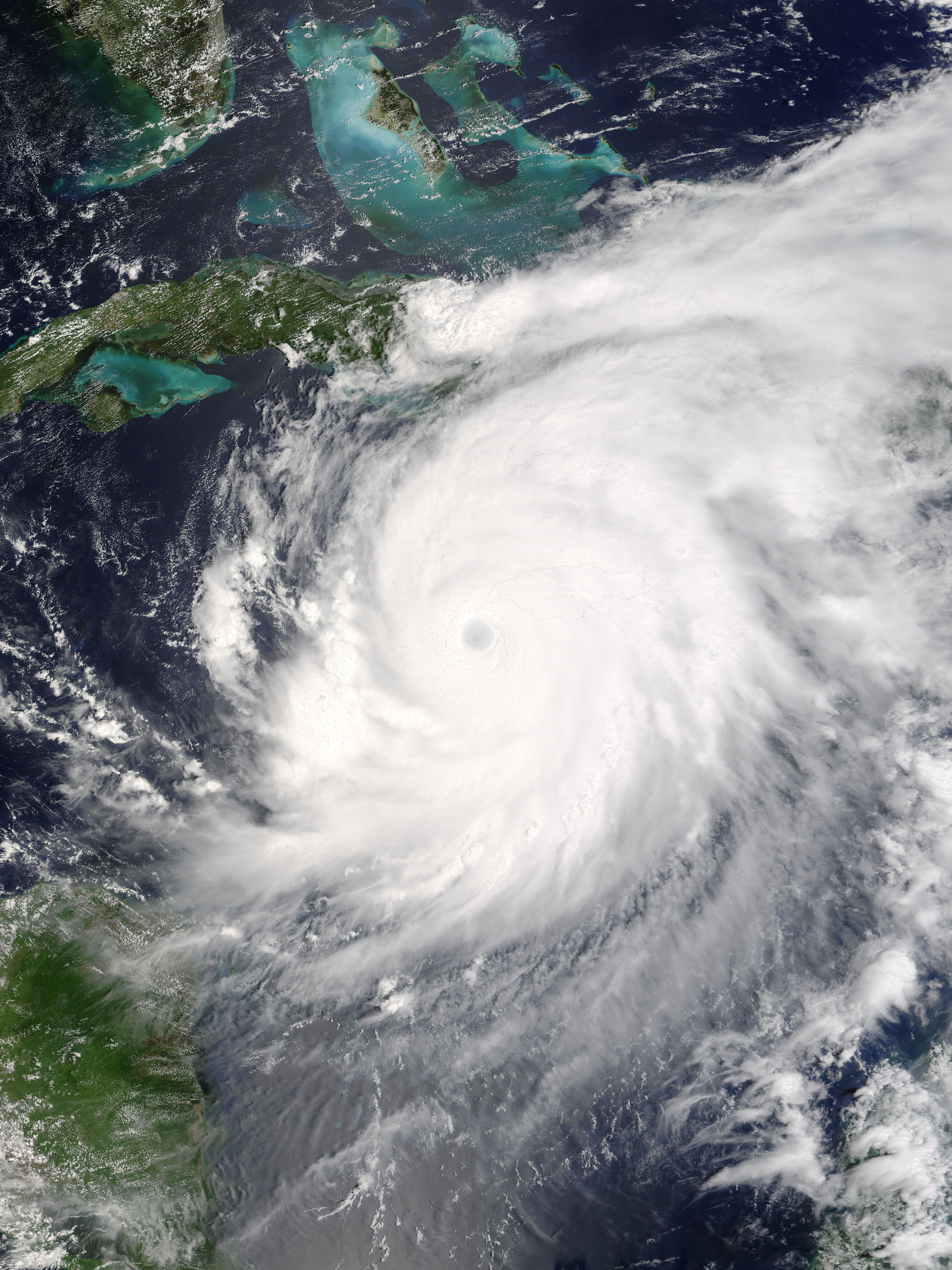
Hurricane Ivan

Tropical cyclones formed in September 2004
| Storm name | Dates active | Max wind km/h (mph) | Pressure (hPa) | Areas affected | Damage (USD) | Deaths | Refs |
|---|---|---|---|---|---|---|---|
| Phoebe | September 1–5 | 85 (50) | 990 | None | None | None | |
| Ivan | September 2–24 | 270 (165) | 910 | Lesser Antilles, Venezuela, Greater Antilles, Gulf Coast of the United States (Alabama, Louisiana), Eastern United States, Atlantic Canada | $26.1 billion | 94 (33) | |
| Sarika | September 3–9 | 100 (65) | 980 | Mariana Islands | None | None | |
| Ten | September 7–9 | 35 (55) | 1009 | None | None | None | |
| TD | September 8–11 | Not specified | 1002 | Ryukyu Islands | None | None | |
| Isis | September 8–16 | 75 (120) | 987 | None | None | None | |
| Javier | September 10–19 | 150 (240) | 930 | Baja California, Southwestern United States | None | None | |
| Haima (Ofel) | September 10–13 | 75 (45) | 996 | Taiwan, East China | $7.64 million | None | |
| TD | September 12 | Unspecified | 1008 | Taiwan | None | None | |
| BOB 03 | September 12–15 | 45 (30) | 996 | West Bengal | None | 33 | |
| Jeanne | September 13–28 | 195 (120) | 950 | Leeward Islands (Guadeloupe), Greater Antilles (Puerto Rico, Dominican Republic), (The Bahamas), Southeastern United States (Florida), Mid-Atlantic states, New England, Atlantic Canada | $7.94 billion | 3,042 | |
| Pablo | September 15–20 | Unspecified | 1008 | Philippines, Vietnam | None | None | |
| TD | September 15–16 | Unspecified | 1006 | East China | None | None | |
| Karl | September 16–24 | 145 (230) | 938 | Faroe Islands, Iceland, Norway | Minimal | None | |
| Lisa | September 19–October 3 | 75 (120) | 987 | None | None | None | |
| Meari (Quinta) | September 19–September 29 | 165 (105) | 940 | Caroline Islands, Japan | $798 million | 18 | |
| TD | September 20 | Unspecified | 1008 | None | None | None | |
| Onil | September 30–October 3 | 100 (65) | 990 | India, Pakistan | None | 9 | |

=== October ===
Typhoon Ma-on

Tropical cyclones formed in October 2004
| Storm name | Dates active | Max wind km/h (mph) | Pressure (hPa) | Areas affected | Damage (USD) | Deaths | Refs |
|---|---|---|---|---|---|---|---|
| BOB 04/05 | October 2–8 | 45 (30) | 1002 | India | $23.9 million | 218 | |
| Ma-on (Rolly) | October 3–10 | 185 (115) | 920 | Japan | $603 million | Unknown | |
| Kay | October 4–6 | 45 (75) | 1004 | None | None | None | |
| Matthew | October 8–10 | 45 (75) | 997 | Gulf Coast of the United States (Louisiana), Midwestern United States, Great Plains | $305 thousand | None | |
| TD | October 9–13 | Unspecified | 1004 | None | None | None | |
| Nicole | October 10–11 | 50 (85) | 986 | Bermuda, Maine, Atlantic Canada | None | None | |
| Tokage (Siony) | October 10–20 | 155 (100) | 940 | Mariana Islands, Taiwan, Japan | $3.23 billion | 95 | |
| Lester | October 11–13 | 50 (85) | 1000 | Southwestern Mexico | None | None | |
| Nock-ten (Tonyo) | October 14–26 | 155 (100) | 945 | Caroline Islands, Mariana Islands, Taiwan, Ryukyu Islands | None | 3 | |
| 02 | October 25–29 | Unspecified | Unspecified | None | None | None | |
| Sixteen-E | October 25–26 | 35 (55) | 1004 | Northern Mexico | None | None | |
| 01F | October 28–30 | 45 (30) | 1001 | None | None | None | |

=== November ===
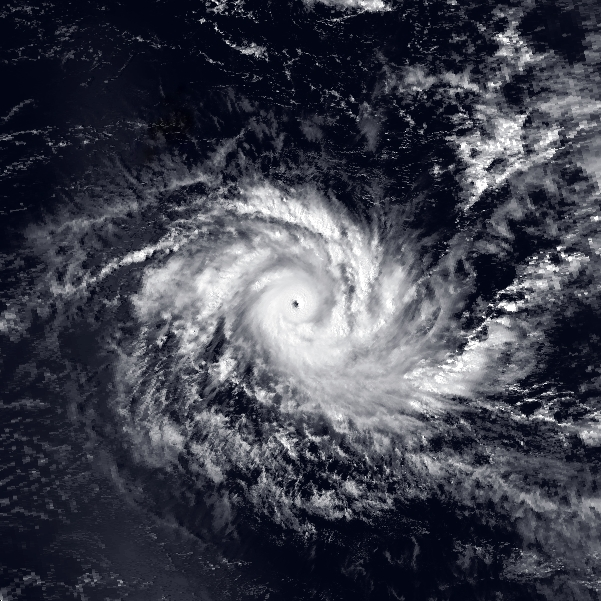
Cyclone Bento

Tropical cyclones formed in November 2004
| Storm name | Dates active | Max wind km/h (mph) | Pressure (hPa) | Areas affected | Damage (USD) | Deaths | Refs |
|---|---|---|---|---|---|---|---|
| ARB 04 | November 2–7 | 55 (35) | 1004 | Sri Lanka | | | |
| Arola | November 6–18 | 110 (70) | 978 | Diego Garcia | None | None | |
| Muifa (Unding) | November 13–25 | 150 (90) | 950 | Philippines, Vietnam, Thailand, Malaysia, Myanmar | $18 million | | |
| TD | November 16–18 | Unspecified | 1006 | None | None | None | |
| Bento | November 19–December 5 | 215 (130) | 915 | Mascarene Islands | None | None | |
| Merbok (Violeta) | November 21–23 | 65 (40) | 1000 | Philippines | $5.1 million | 31 | |
| Winnie | November 27–30 | Unspecified | 1002 | Philippines | $14.6 million | 1,593 | |
| Nanmadol (Yoyong) | November 29–December 4 | 165 (105) | 935 | Caroline Islands, Philippines, Taiwan | $60.8 million | 77 | |
| Agni | November 29–December 2 | 100 (65) | 994 | Somalia | None | None | |
| Otto | November 29–December 3 | 50 (85) | 995 | None | None | None | |

=== December ===
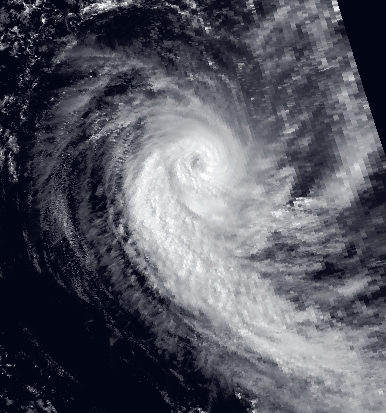
Cyclone Chambo

Tropical cyclones formed in December 2004
| Storm name | Dates active | Max wind km/h (mph) | Pressure (hPa) | Areas affected | Damage (USD) | Deaths | Refs |
|---|---|---|---|---|---|---|---|
| 05S | December 3–5 | 35 (56) | 998 | Indonesia | None | None | |
| 02F | December 3–14 | 55 (35) | 1000 | None | None | None | |
| 03F | December 5–10 | 45 (30) | 1000 | None | None | None | |
| Talas (Zosimo) | December 11–20 | 75 (45) | 994 | Marshall Islands, Caroline Islands | $750,000 | None | |
| 05 | December 11–11 | Unspecified | Unspecified | None | None | None | |
| Noru | December 17–21 | 75 (45) | 990 | Mariana Islands | None | None | |
| Judy | December 21–27 | 85 (50) | 987 | None | None | None | |
| Chambo | December 22–30 | 155 (100) | 950 | Cocos Islands | None | None | |
| Raymond | December 30, 2004 – January 10, 2005 | 85 (50) | 985 | Western Australia | Minimal | None | |

== Global effects ==
| Season name | | Areas affected | Systems formed | Named storms | Hurricane-force tropical cyclones | Damage (2004 USD) | Deaths | Ref |
|---|---|---|---|---|---|---|---|---|
| North Atlantic Ocean (Note: The wind speeds for this tropical cyclone/basin are based on the Saffir Simpson Scale which uses 1-minute sustained winds.) | | Southeastern United States, Atlantic Canada, Lesser Antilles, Greater Antilles, Yucatán Peninsula, Mid-Atlantic states, New England, East Coast of the United States, Cape Verde, Windward Islands, Midwestern United States, Lucayan Archipelago, Leeward Islands, Faroe Islands, Iceland, Norway, Great Plains, Bermudas, Northeastern United States | 16 | 15 | 9 | $60.41 billion | 3,164 (97) | |
| Eastern and Central Pacific Ocean | | Revillagigedo Islands, Clarion Island, Southwestern Mexico, Northwestern Mexico, Baja California Peninsula, Southwestern United States, Western United States | 17 | 12 | 6 | Unknown | —N/a | |
| Western Pacific Ocean (Note: Only systems that formed either before or on December 31, 2004 are counted in the seasonal totals.) | | Caroline Islands, Philippines, Japan, Vietnam, Republic of China, Cambodia, Laos, Thailand, Mariana Islands, East China, Ryukyu Islands, Korean Peninsula, South China, Wake Island, Marshall Islands, Russian Far East, Malaysia, Myanmar | 45 | 29 | 20 | $18.766 billion | 2,435 | |
| North Indian Ocean (Note: The wind speeds for this tropical cyclone/basin are based on the IMD Scale which uses 3-minute sustained winds.) | | Myanmar, Bangladesh, West India, East India, Pakistan, Somalia, Maldives | 9 | 4 | 2 | $129.8 million | 587 | |
| South-West Indian Ocean | January – June (Note: Only systems that formed either on or after January 1, 2004 are counted in the seasonal totals.) (Note: The wind speeds for this tropical cyclone are based on Météo-France, which uses wind gusts.) | Mascarene Islands, Mauritius, Réunion, Juan de Nova Island, Madagascar, Mozambique, Malawi, Seychelles, Tromelin Island, Agaléga | 10 | 4 | 4 | $250 million | 396 | |
| South-West Indian Ocean | July – December | Diego Garcia, Rodrigues, Madagascar | 6 | 4 | 3 | —N/a | —N/a | |
| Australian region | January – June | Western Australia, Queensland, Northern Territory, South Australia | 10 | 8 | 4 | $20 million | —N/a | |
| Australian region | July – December | Western Australia, Northern Territory | 2 | 1 | —N/a | Unknown | —N/a | |
| South Pacific Ocean | January – June | Vanuatu, Solomon Islands, New Caledonia, New Zealand | 10 | 1 | 1 | $7.97 million | 16 | |
| South Pacific Ocean | July – December | —N/a | 4 | 1 | —N/a | Unknown | —N/a | |
| South Atlantic Ocean | | Brazil | 1 | 1 | 1 | $350 million | 11 | |
| Worldwide | | (See above) | 130 (Note: The sum of the number of systems in each basin will not equal the number shown as the total. This is because when systems move between basins, it creates a discrepancy in the actual number of systems.) | 80 | 50 | $79.94 billion | 6,609 (97) | |

== See also ==
- Tropical cyclones by year
- List of earthquakes in 2004
- Tornadoes of 2004
- 2004 Indian Ocean earthquake and tsunami

== Notes ==
^{1} Only systems that formed either on or after January 1, 2004 are counted in the seasonal totals.
^{2} Only systems that formed either before or on December 31, 2004 are counted in the seasonal totals.
^{3} The wind speeds for this tropical cyclone/basin are based on the IMD scale which uses 3-minute sustained winds.
^{4} The wind speeds for this tropical cyclone/basin are based on the Saffir–Simpson scale which uses 1-minute sustained winds.
^{5}The wind speeds for this tropical cyclone are based on Météo-France which uses gust winds.
