= Typhoon Mindulle (2016) =

Pacific typhoon in 2016

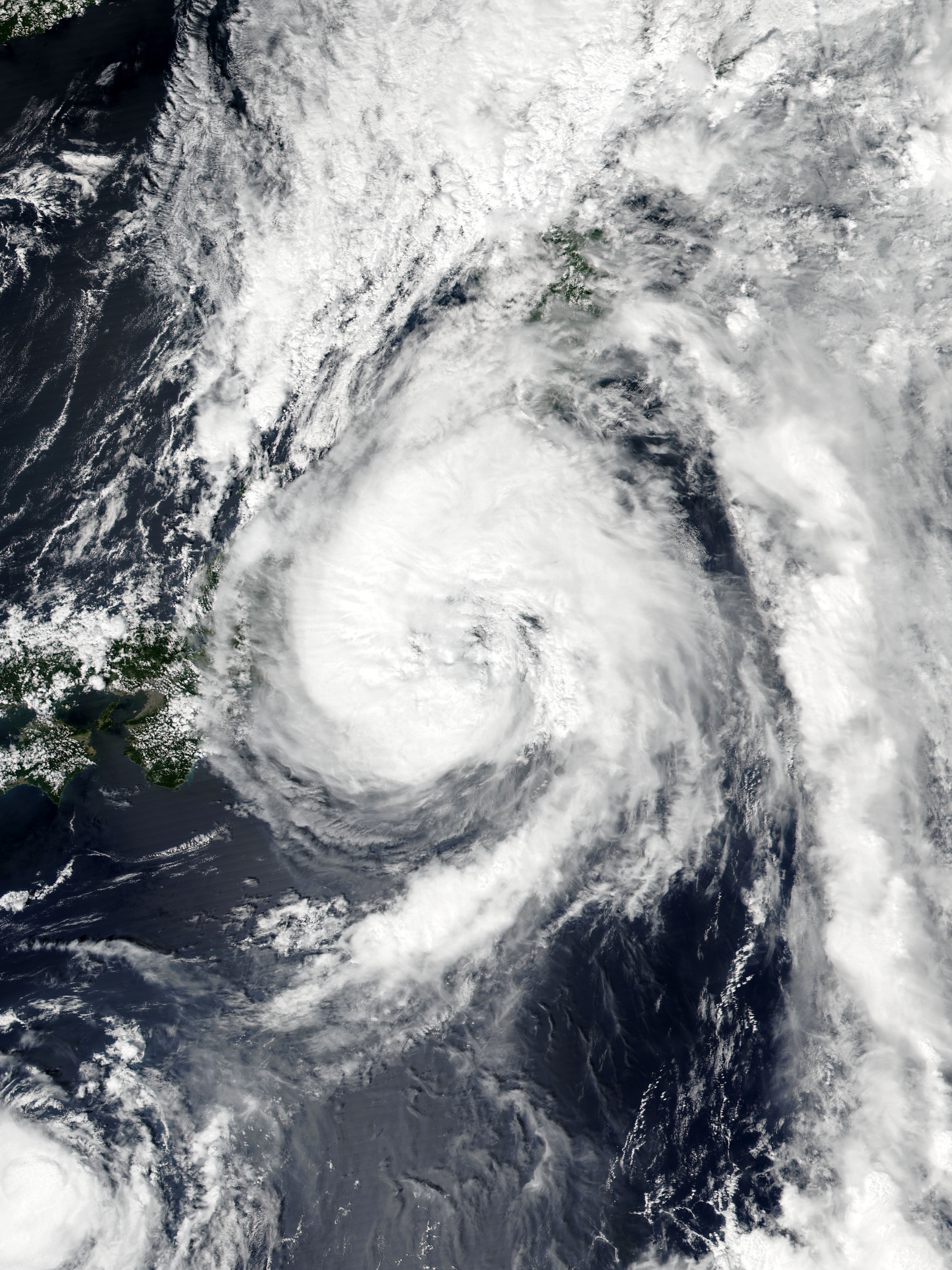
- Typhoon Mindulle over the Greater Tokyo Area on August 22, with Tropical Storm Lionrock to its southwest

Meteorological history
- Formed: August 17, 2016
- Dissipated: August 23, 2016

Typhoon
- 10-minute sustained (JMA)
- Highest winds: 120 km/h (75 mph)
- Lowest pressure: 975 hPa (mbar); 28.79 inHg

Category 1-equivalent typhoon
- 1-minute sustained (SSHWS/JTWC)
- Highest winds: 120 km/h (75 mph)
- Lowest pressure: 974 hPa (mbar); 28.76 inHg

Overall effects
- Fatalities: 3 total
- Damage: $448 million
- Areas affected: Mariana Islands, Japan
- IBTrACS
- Part of the 2016 Pacific typhoon season

Typhoon Mindulle was a strong tropical cyclone which affected Japan in mid August 2016. The ninth named storm and second typhoon of the 2016 Pacific typhoon season, Mindulle was first noted as a low-pressure area northwest of Guam on August 17. Two days later, it was upgraded into a tropical storm, being named Mindulle. Gradually intensifying, Mindulle peaked as a Category 1-equivalent hurricane on the Saffir-Simpson scale on August 22 before making landfall in Chiba Prefecture later that day. Mindulle rapidly weakened, dissipating the next day.

Mindulle primarily affected Japan, forcing nearly 900,000 to evacuate. The third storm to strike Japan in a week, Mindulle exacerbated flooding caused Chanthu and Kompasu, causing 3 fatalities to occur. In Chiba, over 100,000 people were without power. In total, Mindulle caused around $448 million in damages.

== Meteorological history ==
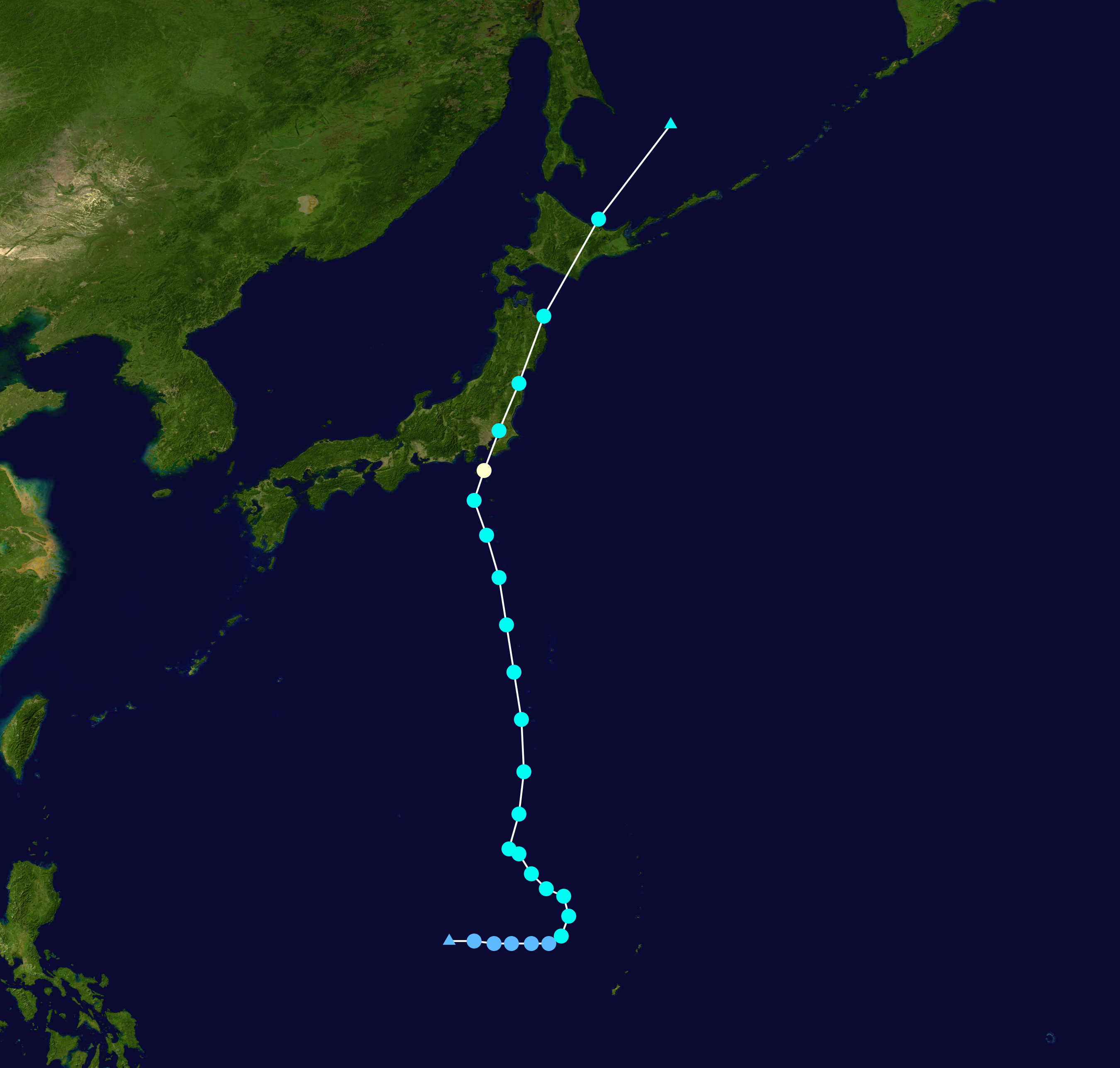
Map plotting the storm's track and intensity, according to the Saffir–Simpson scale Map key Saffir–Simpson scale Tropical depression (≤38 mph, ≤62 km/h) Tropical storm (39–73 mph, 63–118 km/h) Category 1 (74–95 mph, 119–153 km/h) Category 2 (96–110 mph, 154–177 km/h) Category 3 (111–129 mph, 178–208 km/h) Category 4 (130–156 mph, 209–251 km/h) Category 5 (≥157 mph, ≥252 km/h) Unknown Storm type Tropical cyclone Subtropical cyclone Extratropical cyclone, remnant low, tropical disturbance, or monsoon depression

The Japan Meteorological Agency (JMA) indicated that a tropical depression had formed northwest of Guam at noon on August 17. A few hours later, the Joint Typhoon Warning Center (JTWC) quickly issued a Tropical Cyclone Formation Alert and also upgraded the system to a tropical depression with the designation 10W on the same day, based on increased symmetric convection associated with a defined but partially exposed low-level circulation center (LLCC) that was embedded within the southwest monsoon surge. One day later, the JTWC upgraded 10W to a tropical storm via the Dvorak technique, with the winds proved by a recent scatterometer pass. The JMA upgraded the system to a tropical storm and named it Mindulle early on August 19, (Note: The name Mindulle (Korean: 민들레, [mindɯɭɭe̞]) was contributed by North Korea and means dandelion (Taraxacum mongolicum) in Korean.) when central convection had become more organized. However, an upper-level low to the north and the predecessor of Tropical Storm Kompasu to the northeast were stifling the development of any poleward outflow.

Moving on the eastern edge of a relatively high-latitude monsoon gyre and being steered by the southern extension of the subtropical ridge anchored east of Japan, the intensification of Mindulle was limited on August 20, owing to modest dry air entrainment resulting in flaring convection near and surrounding the LLCC. Although the JMA upgraded Mindulle to a severe tropical storm when it was approximately 380 km (240 mi) northwest of Chichi-jima at around 15:00 JST (06:00 UTC) on August 21, outflow from Tropical Storm Lionrock to the west was inhibiting further development and causing a partially exposed LLCC with deep convection displaced southward, as the distance between their centers was only about 600 km (370 mi) at that time. With warm sea surface temperatures of between 30 and 31 °C (86 and 88 °F), good equatorward and poleward outflow channels, as well as low vertical wind shear, the JMA upgraded Mindulle to a typhoon at around 03:00 JST on August 22 (18:00 UTC on August 21), when the center was located only about 40 km (25 mi) east of Hachijō-jima. At around 12:30 JST (03:30 UTC), Mindulle made landfall over the area near Tateyama, Chiba.

== Preparations and impact ==
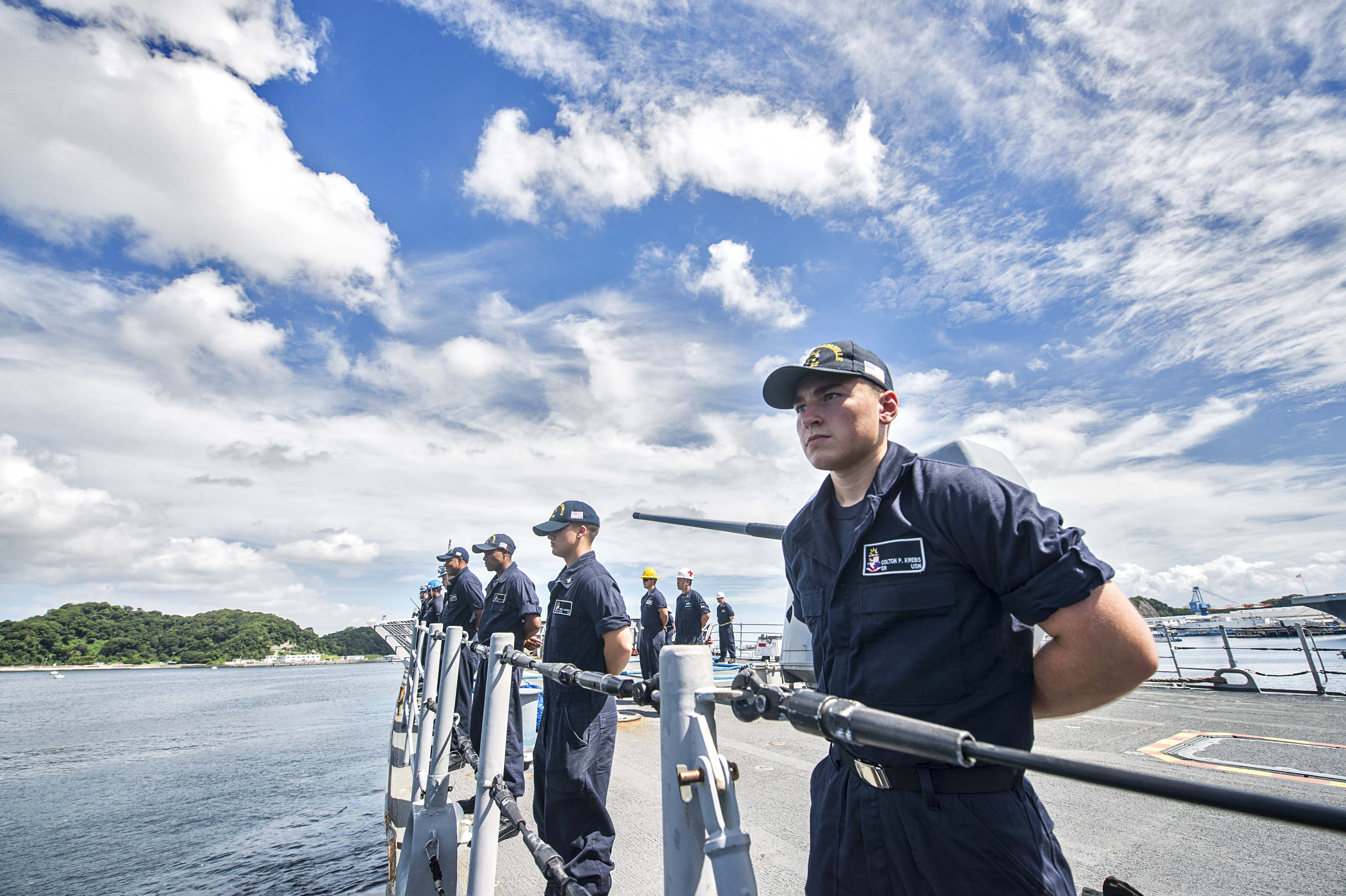
USS Chancellorsville was departing from Yokosuka on August 21 in advanced of Typhoon Mindulle

While Mindulle was in its developmental stages, the Guam National Weather Service office issued a tropical storm watch for Tinian and Saipan. On the islands, the storm produced gusty winds and showers.

Across the Kantō Plain, about 850,000 people were ordered to evacuate. In Kanagawa and Tokyo prefectures, officials issued landslide watches. On Hokkaido, more than 2,700 people evacuated due to Mindulle. Ahead of the storm, Narita International Airport – Tokyo's main airport – was closed, causing 425 flights to be canceled, affecting tens of thousands of travelers. Hundreds of Japan Railway trains were also canceled. American military bases in Japan were set at Tropical Cyclone Condition of Readiness (TCCOR) 1, and non-essential people were directed to stay in their lodgings after most services were shut down.

The third storm to strike Japan within a week, Mindulle dropped heavy rainfall on Honshū, where the soil was saturated due to rainfall dropped by the earlier tropical storms Chanthu and Kompasu. Ōme, Tokyo recorded nearly 268 mm (10.6 in) of rainfall. The offshore islands of Hachijō-jima and Izu Ōshima both reported 86 mm (3.4 in) of precipitation in just one hour, which is about half the average August rainfall for both locations. Shizuoka recorded nearly 360 mm (14 in) of rainfall. In the capital city Tokyo, Mindulle dropped 105 mm (4.1 in) of rainfall, which is 66% of the average August rainfall. Narita Airport recorded winds of 126 km/h (78 mph), which forced air traffic controllers to evacuate the control tower. This was the first time the tower was evacuated due to a typhoon, and only the second time in its history after the 2011 Japan earthquake. The island of Miyake-jima recorded winds of 150 km/h (93 mph), and Yokosuka Naval Base recorded winds of 58 mph (93 km/h), which restricted outdoor activity.

Floods from Mindulle's heavy rainfall submerged a tunnel along the Chūō Expressway in Tokyo. Portions of Naval Air Facility Atsugi, Yokota Air Base, and Camp Zama were flooded, with runways submerged. At Yokota Air Base, the floods cut off power to five housing towers, forcing the occupants to evacuate. Floodwaters covered roads and damaged homes in Hokkaido, and a man drowned in Kitami, days after floods from Kompasu also killed a man on Hokkaido. A woman in Sagamihara outside Tokyo also drowned during the storm. Nationwide, Mindulle's effects injured 61 people. Across southeastern Honshu, 15 rivers flooded, and a train line was washed out in western Tokyo, forcing a train of commuters to evacuate. High winds knocked a tree onto a central Tokyo train station, which suspended service on the Tokyo Loop Line. Fallen power lines left over 100,000 people without power, mostly in Chiba Prefecture.

Total financial loss in Japan, along with Tropical Storm Kompasu, were counted to be ¥45 billion (US$448 million).

== See also ==
- Weather of 2016
- Tropical cyclones in 2016
- Other storms of the same name
- Tropical Storm Talas (2011)
- Typhoon Man-yi (2013)
- Typhoon Phanfone (2014)
- Tropical Storm Etau (2015)
