= Typhoon Mindulle (2021) =

Pacific typhoon in 2021

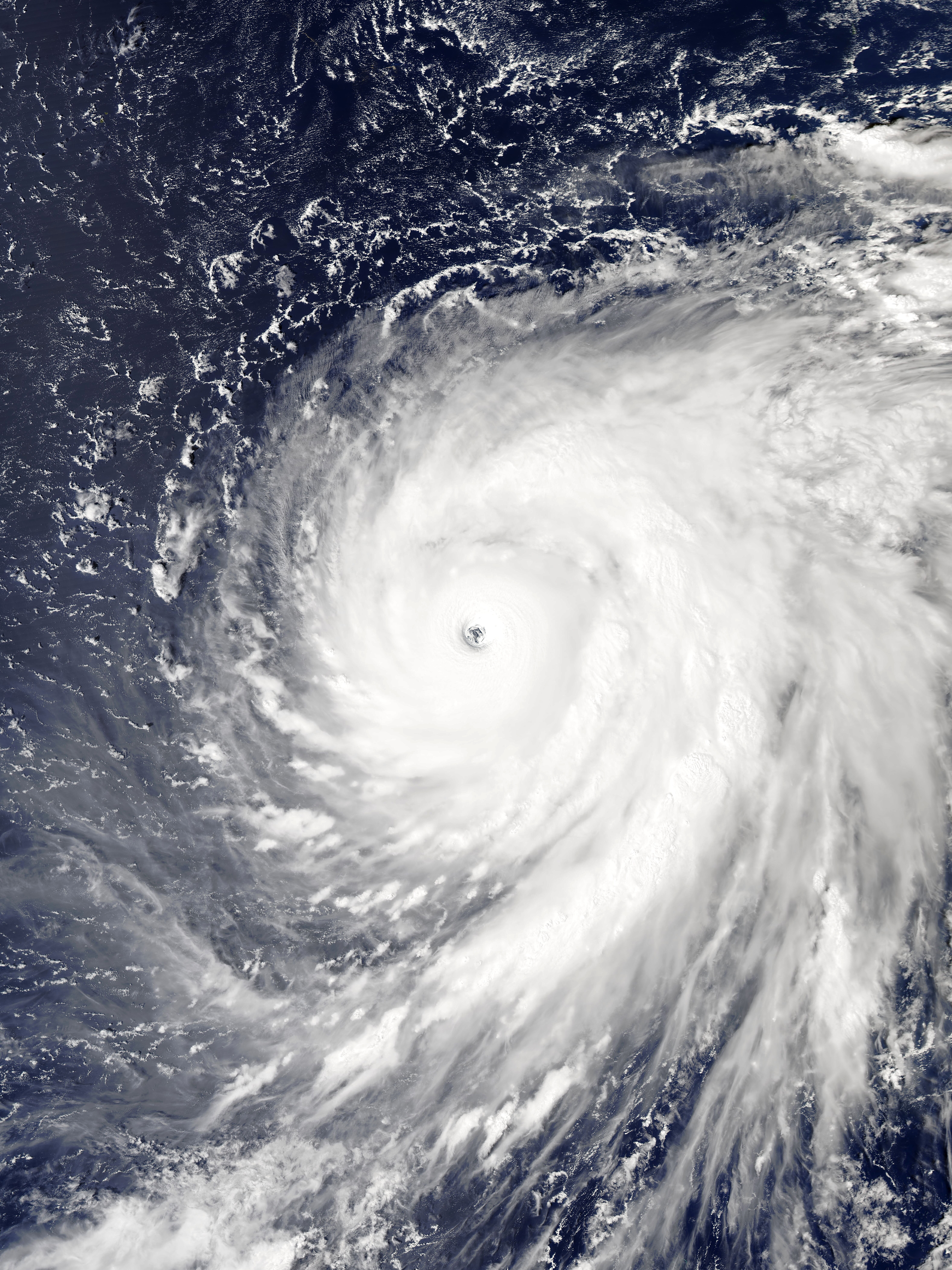
- Typhoon Mindulle near peak intensity on September 26

Meteorological history
- Formed: September 22, 2021
- Dissipated: October 2, 2021

Violent typhoon
- 10-minute sustained (JMA)
- Highest winds: 195 km/h (120 mph)
- Lowest pressure: 920 hPa (mbar); 27.17 inHg

Category 5-equivalent super typhoon
- 1-minute sustained (SSHWS/JTWC)
- Highest winds: 260 km/h (160 mph)
- Lowest pressure: 916 hPa (mbar); 27.05 inHg

Overall effects
- Fatalities: None
- Damage: Minimal
- Areas affected: Japan, Russia, Alaska
- IBTrACS
- Part of the 2021 Pacific typhoon season

Typhoon Mindulle was a long-lived and strong typhoon that lasted out the sea in late September 2021. As the seventeenth named storm, and the sixth typhoon of the 2021 Pacific typhoon season, Mindulle originated from an area of low pressure 703 nmi (1,302 km; 809 mi) southeast of Guam. It quickly organized until attaining the name Mindulle. Mindulle eventually became a Category 1 typhoon on September 25 in 3:00 UTC. Wind shear slowed its rapid intensification, but it still managed to intensify. Mindulle eventually reached Category 5 typhoon the next day, as the storm had a large eye in its center. Wind shear weakened the storm, but reintensified. On October 2, JMA issued its last advisory as it becomes extratropical as it continued moving northeast.

== Meteorological history ==
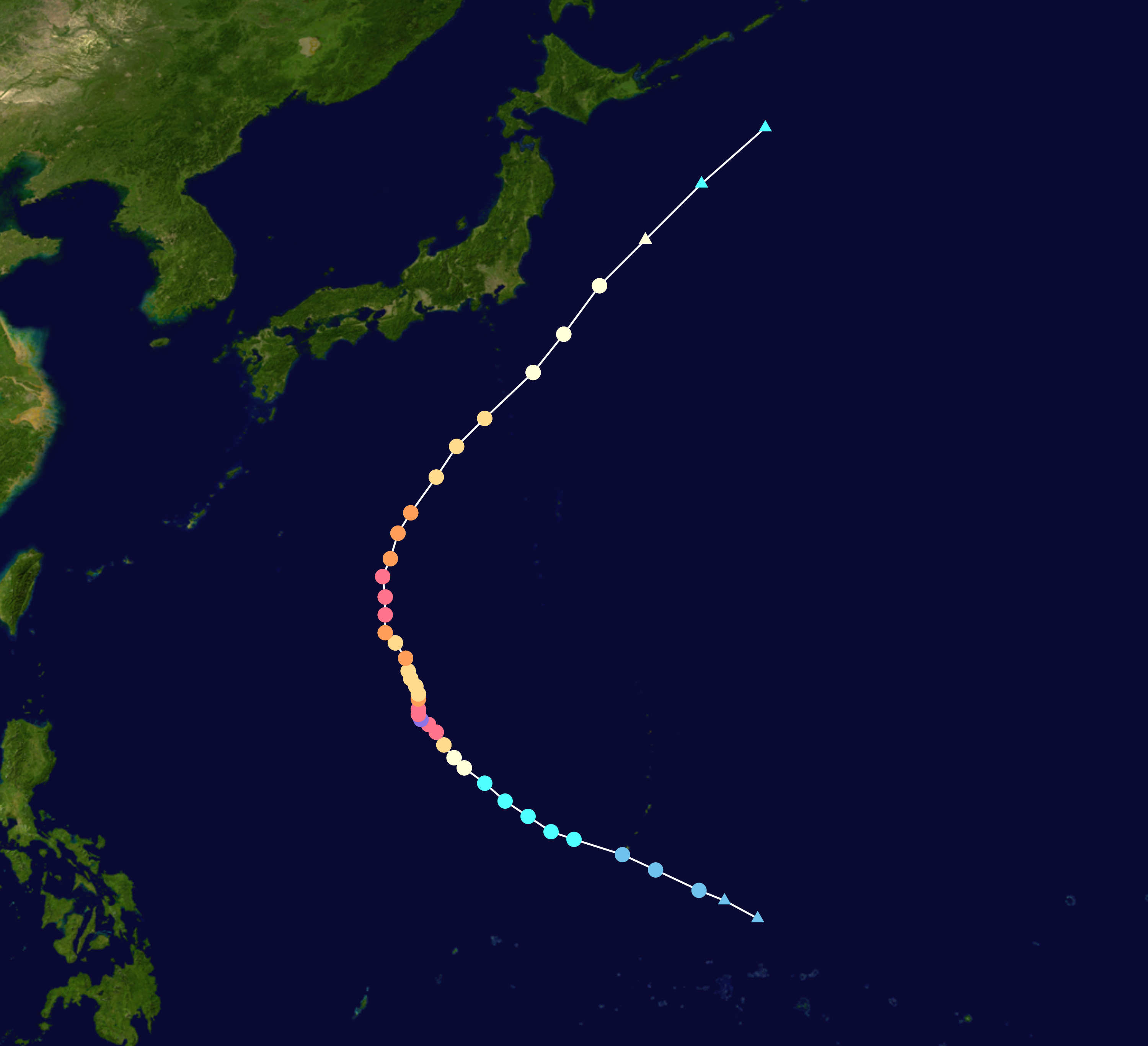
Map plotting the storm's track and intensity, according to the Saffir–Simpson scale Map key Saffir–Simpson scale Tropical depression (≤38 mph, ≤62 km/h) Tropical storm (39–73 mph, 63–118 km/h) Category 1 (74–95 mph, 119–153 km/h) Category 2 (96–110 mph, 154–177 km/h) Category 3 (111–129 mph, 178–208 km/h) Category 4 (130–156 mph, 209–251 km/h) Category 5 (≥157 mph, ≥252 km/h) Unknown Storm type Tropical cyclone Subtropical cyclone Extratropical cyclone, remnant low, tropical disturbance, or monsoon depression

On September 21, the Joint Typhoon Warning Center spotted an area of convection formed approximately 703 nmi (1,302 km; 809 mi) southeast of Guam. The system rapidly consolidated itself and formed a well-defined LLCC, and thus, the system strengthened into a tropical depression on 00:00 UTC of September 22. The JTWC did the same later that day, designating the system as 20W. At 09:00 UTC of September 23, the JTWC upgraded it to a tropical storm, as its low-level circulation center became partially exposed. The Japan Meteorological Agency did the same three hours later, and named it Mindulle. (Note: The name Mindulle (Korean: 민들레, [mindɯɭɭe̞]) was contributed by North Korea and means dandelion (Taraxacum mongolicum) in Korean.) At 12:00 UTC of September 24, the JMA upgraded it to a severe tropical storm. By 03:00 UTC the next day, the JTWC upgraded it to a Category 1-equivalent typhoon, as it developed a small eye. The presence of dry air had slowed its intensification, but it still managed to become a typhoon. Mindulle started to rapidly intensify as it quickly intensified into a Category 2-equivalent typhoon. Its eye expanded but became ragged due to the presence of dry air. Mindulle continued its rapid intensification, as it further intensified into a Category 4-equivalent typhoon at 15:00 UTC. Mindulle's eye became well-defined and at 03:00 UTC the next day, it became a Category 5-equivalent super typhoon, making it the third super typhoon of this season. Satellite imagery showed that the typhoon had developed a well defined 15 nmi (28 km; 17 mi) eye and deepening of the central core. At 15:00 UTC, Mindulle weakened into a Category 4-equivalent super typhoon as the eye and the convective structure started to degrade. It also underwent an eyewall replacement cycle, as it developed another eyewall. At 03:00 UTC of September 27, the JTWC further downgraded the system to a Category 3-equivalent typhoon, and six hours later, the agency had further downgraded it to a Category 2-equivalent typhoon because of the effects of the eyewall replacement cycle and the increasing presence of dry air. At 15:00 UTC of September 28, Mindulle re-intensified into a Category 3-equivalent typhoon, as it moved over favorable conditions. Satellite imagery showed that the typhoon continued to struggle to intensify. Its 20 nmi (37 km; 23 mi) eye had steadily shrunk but it remained cloud covered and ragged. By the next day at 03:00 UTC, the JTWC re-upgraded it to a Category 4-equivalent typhoon as the eye cleared out again. At 21:00 UTC of September 29, it rapidly weakened and by 15:00 UTC the next day, it weakened from a Category 3-equivalent typhoon to a Category 1-equivalent typhoon. Cool dry air and cool sea-surface temperatures were responsible for the weakening. At 21:00 UTC of October 1, the JTWC issued its final warning as it downgraded to a tropical storm. Three hours later, JMA also issued its final warning, as it became extratropical cyclone, off the coast of Hokkaido. The storm continued northeast towards Alaska until losing its identity.

== Preparations and impact ==
=== Japan ===
The storm's outer rain bands brought heavy rain and winds across eastern Japan. Wind gusts of 150 kph (95 mph) were recorded in Choshi and Miyake Island in the Izu islands chain. 10 people were injured in Kanagawa and 4 were in injured in Ibaraki.

== See also ==
- Weather of 2021
- Tropical cyclones in 2021
- 2021 Pacific typhoon season
- Other storms of the same name
- Typhoon Lupit (2003)
- Typhoon Sudal (2004)
- Typhoon Dolphin (2015)
