= List of storms named Mawar =

The name Mawar (Malay: mawar, [ˈma.war]) has been used for four tropical cyclones in the western North Pacific Ocean. The name was contributed by Malaysia and means rose in Malay.

- Typhoon Mawar (2005) (T0511, 11W) – struck Japan.
- Typhoon Mawar (2012) (T1203, 04W, Ambo) – no threat to land.
- Severe Tropical Storm Mawar (2017) (T1716, 18W) – made landfall in China as a tropical storm.
- Typhoon Mawar (2023) (T2302, 02W, Betty) – passed Guam as a powerful super typhoon.

Preceded by Sanvu	Pacific typhoon season names Mawar	Succeeded by Guchol
