= List of storms named Malou =

The name Malou (Cantonese: 瑪瑙, [maː˨˧ lou˨˧]) has been used for four tropical cyclones in the western North Pacific Ocean. The name was contributed by Macau and means agate in Cantonese.

- Tropical Storm Malou (2004) (T0411, 15W) – struck Japan.
- Severe Tropical Storm Malou (2010) (T1009, 10W, Henry) – struck Japan and brought heavy rain.
- Tropical Storm Malou (2016) (T1613) - a storm that was not recognized by the JTWC.
- Typhoon Malou (2021) (T2120, 25W) - a Category 2 typhoon that remained out to sea.

Preceded by Namtheun	Pacific typhoon season names Malou	Succeeded by Nyatoh
