= List of storms named Guchol =

The name Guchol (Yapese: guchoel, [ɣʊʈ͡ʂœːl]) has been used for four tropical cyclones in the Western Pacific Ocean. The name was contributed by the Federated States of Micronesia and means turmeric (Curcuma longa) in Yapese.

- Severe Tropical Storm Guchol (2005) (T0512, 12W) - curved to the northwest and never threatened land.
- Typhoon Guchol (2012) (T1204, 05W, Butchoy) – a powerful typhoon that struck Japan.
- Tropical Storm Guchol (2017) (T1717, 19W, Kiko) – a weak tropical storm that affected Taiwan and China.
- Typhoon Guchol (2023) (T2303, 03W, Chedeng) – churned out of the ocean without affecting any landmass.

Preceded by Mawar	Pacific typhoon season names Guchol	Succeeded by Talim
