= List of storms named Omais =

The name Omais (Palauan: omais, [oˈmajs]) has been used for four tropical cyclones in the West Pacific Ocean. The name, contributed by the United States, means to wander around in Palauan.

- Tropical Storm Omais (2004) (T0403, 06W, Enteng) – a weak storm that formed in May of 2004.
- Tropical Storm Omais (2010) (T1001, 02W, Agaton) – recurved out to sea as a tropical storm.
- Severe Tropical Storm Omais (2016) (T1605, 07W) – recurved out to sea, later threatening Alaska as an extratropical cyclone.
- Tropical Storm Omais (2021) (T2112, 16W, Isang) – a long-lived tropical cyclone that affected South Korea and the Mariana Islands.

Preceded by Nida	Pacific typhoon season names Omais	Succeeded by Luc-Binh
