= List of storms named Mindulle =

The name Mindulle (Korean: 민들레, [mindɯɭɭe̞]) has been used for four tropical cyclones in the western North Pacific Ocean. The name was contributed by North Korea and means dandelion (Taraxacum mongolicum) in Korean.

- Typhoon Mindulle (2004) (T0407, 10W, Igme) – struck the Philippines, Taiwan and China.
- Tropical Storm Mindulle (2010) (T1005, 06W) – a Category 1 typhoon based on JTWC that struck Vietnam.
- Typhoon Mindulle (2016) (T1609, 10W) – affected much of Japan during August 2016.
- Typhoon Mindulle (2021) (T2116, 20W) – reached category 5 super typhoon status and affected eastern Japan.

Preceded by Dianmu	Pacific typhoon season names Mindulle	Succeeded by Lionrock
