= List of storms named Sanvu =

The name Sanvu (Cantonese: 珊瑚, [saːn˥ wuː˨˩]) has been used for four tropical cyclones in the western North Pacific Ocean. The name was contributed by Macau and means coral in Cantonese.

- Severe Tropical Storm Sanvu (2005) (T0510, 10W, Huaning) – struck China.
- Severe Tropical Storm Sanvu (2012) (T1202, 03W) – remained in open sea.
- Typhoon Sanvu (2017) (T1715, 17W) - did not make any landfall.
- Tropical Storm Sanvu (2023) (T2301, 01W) - churned out of the ocean.

Preceded by Pakhar	Pacific typhoon season names Sanvu	Succeeded by Mawar
