= Typhoon Dianmu (2004) =

Pacific typhoon in 2004

Typhoon Dianmu (Helen)
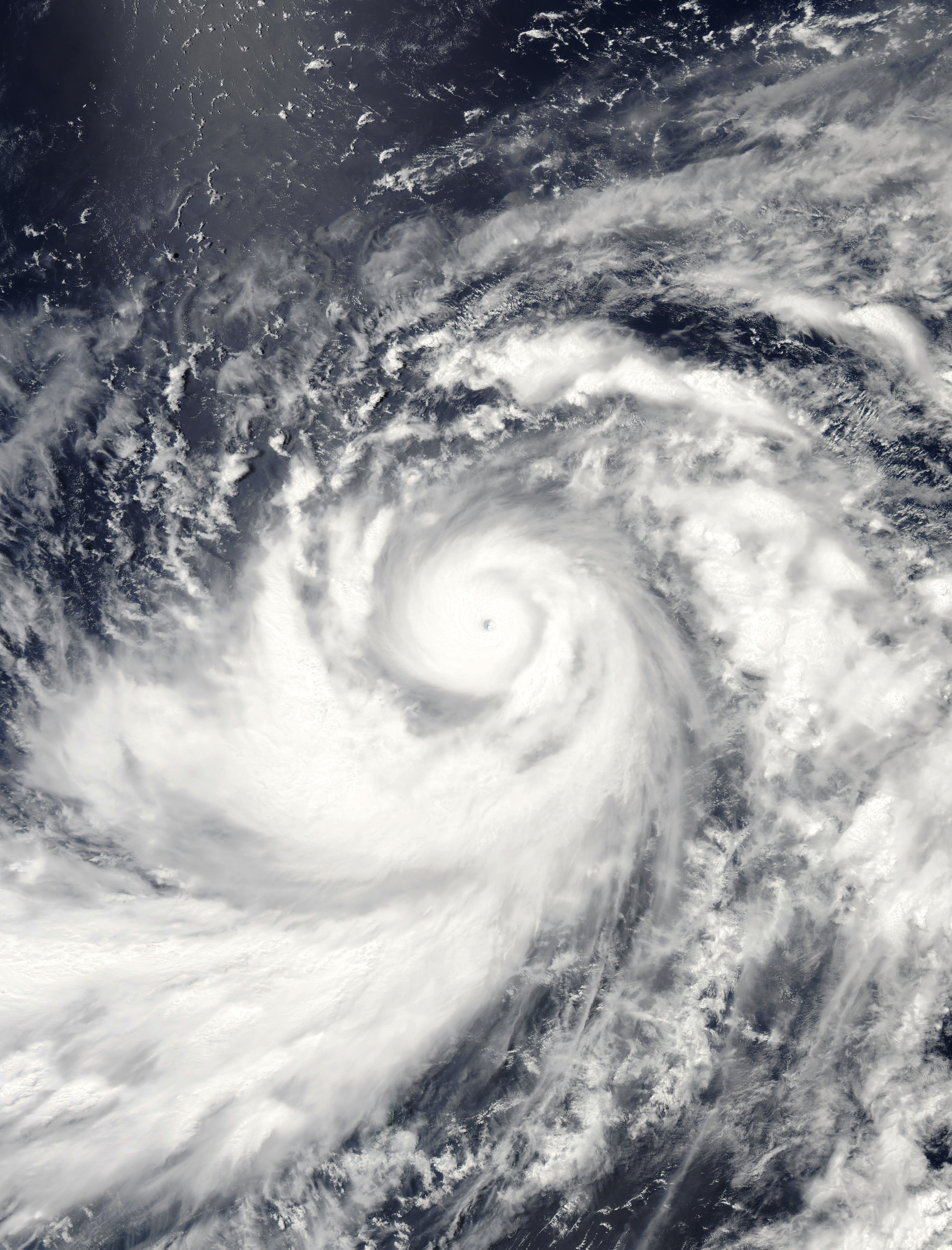
- Typhoon Dianmu at peak intensity on June 16

Meteorological history
- Formed: June 13, 2004
- Extratropical: June 21, 2004
- Dissipated: June 28, 2004

Very strong typhoon
- 10-minute sustained (JMA)
- Highest winds: 185 km/h (115 mph)
- Lowest pressure: 915 hPa (mbar); 27.02 inHg

Category 5-equivalent super typhoon
- 1-minute sustained (SSHWS/JTWC)
- Highest winds: 285 km/h (180 mph)
- Lowest pressure: 879 hPa (mbar); 25.96 inHg

Overall effects
- Fatalities: 6 direct
- Damage: $68.5 million (2004 USD)
- Areas affected: Caroline Islands, Palau, Japan, South Korea
- IBTrACS
- Part of the 2004 Pacific typhoon season

Typhoon Dianmu, known in the Philippines as Typhoon Helen, was a powerful typhoon that struck southeastern Japan during the 2004 Pacific typhoon season.

Dianmu formed on June 13 as a Tropical Depression and moved west-northwest where it rapidly strengthened to typhoon status on June 16. Dianmu then strengthened to a 285 km/h (180 mph) typhoon, making it one of nine typhoons to reach that intensity since 1990 and equaled its power with Typhoon Chaba as the strongest typhoons of the 2004 season. After reaching peak intensity, Dianmu turned northwest before skirting the minor Japanese islands and making landfall in Japan as a tropical storm. Dianmu then became extratropical on June 21.

Dianmu caused four fatalities and considerable damage across southern and eastern Japan. Damage amounted to US$68.3 million. Two more fatalities were also reported in neighboring South Korea.

== Meteorological history ==
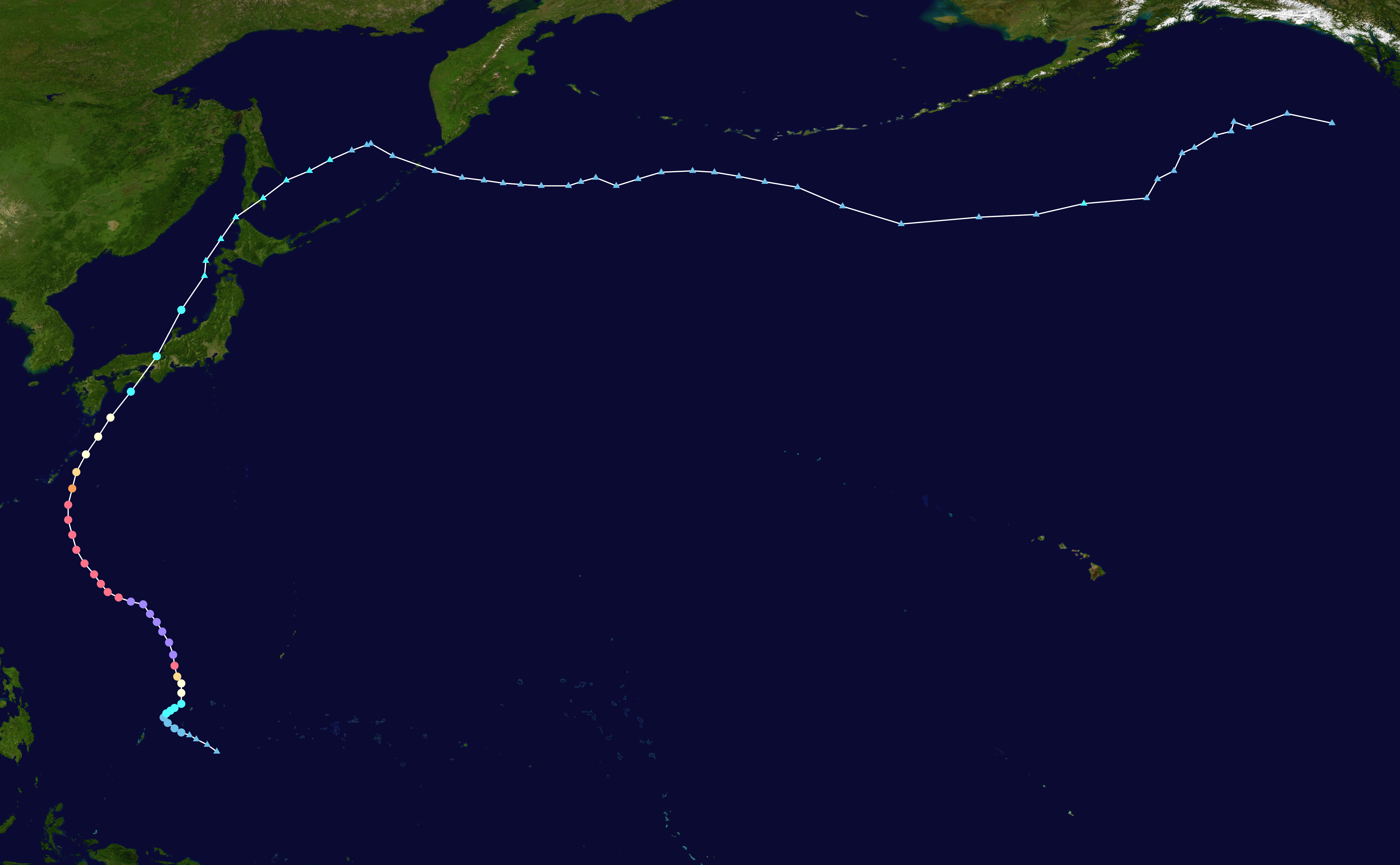
Map plotting the storm's track and intensity, according to the Saffir–Simpson scale Map key Saffir–Simpson scale Tropical depression (≤38 mph, ≤62 km/h) Tropical storm (39–73 mph, 63–118 km/h) Category 1 (74–95 mph, 119–153 km/h) Category 2 (96–110 mph, 154–177 km/h) Category 3 (111–129 mph, 178–208 km/h) Category 4 (130–156 mph, 209–251 km/h) Category 5 (≥157 mph, ≥252 km/h) Unknown Storm type Tropical cyclone Subtropical cyclone Extratropical cyclone, remnant low, tropical disturbance, or monsoon depression

An area of disturbed weather formed on June 11 within a monsoon trough 550 km (340 mi) southeast of Palau. Satellite imagery showed the disturbance beginning to acquire a low level circulation as the system was within a favorable area for tropical development. As the system began to strengthen, the Joint Typhoon Warning Center issued its first warning on the system as it strengthen to a tropical depression on June 13.

Moving westward, Tropical Depression 09W continued to strengthen and on June 14, the Joint Typhoon Warning Center and the Japan Meteorological Agency upgraded the depression to a tropical storm named Dianmu. (Note: The name Dianmu (Mandarin: 电母, [tiɛn˥˩ mu˧˩˧]) was contributed by China and refers to Dianmu, the goddess of lightning in Mandarin.) After becoming a tropical storm, Dianmu remained stationary west of Yap where it continued to strengthen. The Japan Meteorological Agency and the Joint Typhoon Warning Center upgraded the storm to typhoon status at 1800 UTC. Dianmu then moved north-northwestward at speeds between 6-9 kts (11–17 km/h, 7-10 mph) as it winds reached 241 km/h (150 mph), prompting the Joint Typhoon Warning Center to upgrade the storm to supertyphoon status on June 15. The following day, Dianmu continued northward as the storm reached category 5 status. At the same time, the storm entered the Philippine Atmospheric, Geophysical and Astronomical Services Administration (PAGASA) area of responsibility and was given the name Helen.

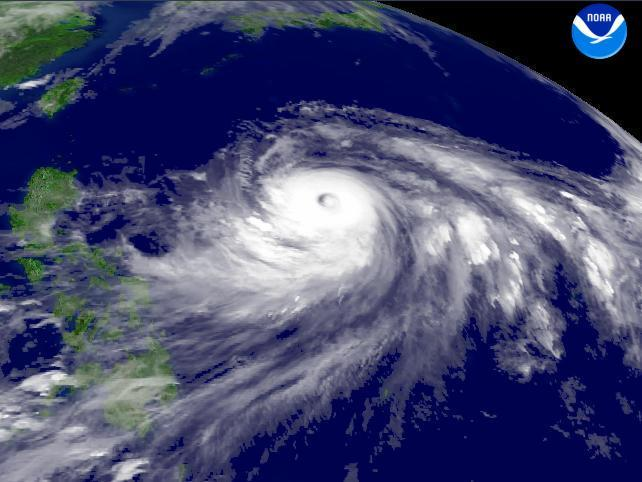
Typhoon Dianmu on June 18

Dianmu reached its maximum intensity as its winds reached up to 285 km/h (180 mph) and the barometric pressure fell to 915 millibars. The JMA assessed the typhoon attaining a 10-minute peak of 185 km/h (115 mph) winds. After maintaining Supertyphoon status for 42 hours, the storm began to weaken as it swung westward. The typhoon briefly regained supertyphoon status on June 18 before finally weakening again a few hours later. The next day, Dianmu swung northward as the center was located 410 km (250 mi) southeast of Okinawa. As it turned northward, dry air entered the storm causing the center to become ragged and eventually resulted in the storm weakening further as the winds dropped to 115 mph (185 km/h) on June 19.

On June 20, the center of Dianmu bypassed Okinawa by 120 km (75 mi) to the east as the storm continued to weaken. Satellite imagery showed the storm losing its deep convection and significant outflow and its winds dropped to 145 km/h (90 mph). As the storm approached Japan, it interacted with a trough which was position northwest of the storm. The resulting interaction with the trough caused the storm to drop below typhoon status. As the storm edged closer to Japan, it began to gradually take on the characteristics of an extratropical cyclone before it made its first landfall in Shikoku before making its second landfall in Honshū on June 21. The Joint Typhoon Warning Center issued its final advisory on Dianmu at 1800 UTC while the JMA continued to issue advisories until June 23. The extratropical remnants of Dianmu then dissipated over the Bering Sea on June 25.

== Preparations ==
Because Dianmu was very close to the islands of Yap and Palau, the National Weather Service began issuing advisories. As Dianmu moved northwestward away from the islands, the advisories were discontinued on June 14. In Okinawa, the approach of Dianmu caused residents to stock up on supplies as all U.S. military bases were put under a Tropical Cyclone Condition of Readiness level three (TCCOR). In Kadena Air Base, military crewmen stowed or secured lightweight equipment. The approach of Typhoon Dianmu resulted in the cancellation of numerous incoming and outgoing flights and ferry service.

In mainland Japan, 130 flights and passenger rail service was canceled, many homes were evacuated, and schools were closed. In South Korea, meteorologists at the Daegu Meteorological Administration and the government of South Korea issued torrential rain advisories as the outer rain bands of the typhoon was forecast to produce heavy rainfall. In addition, internal flights in South Korea were canceled.

== Impact ==
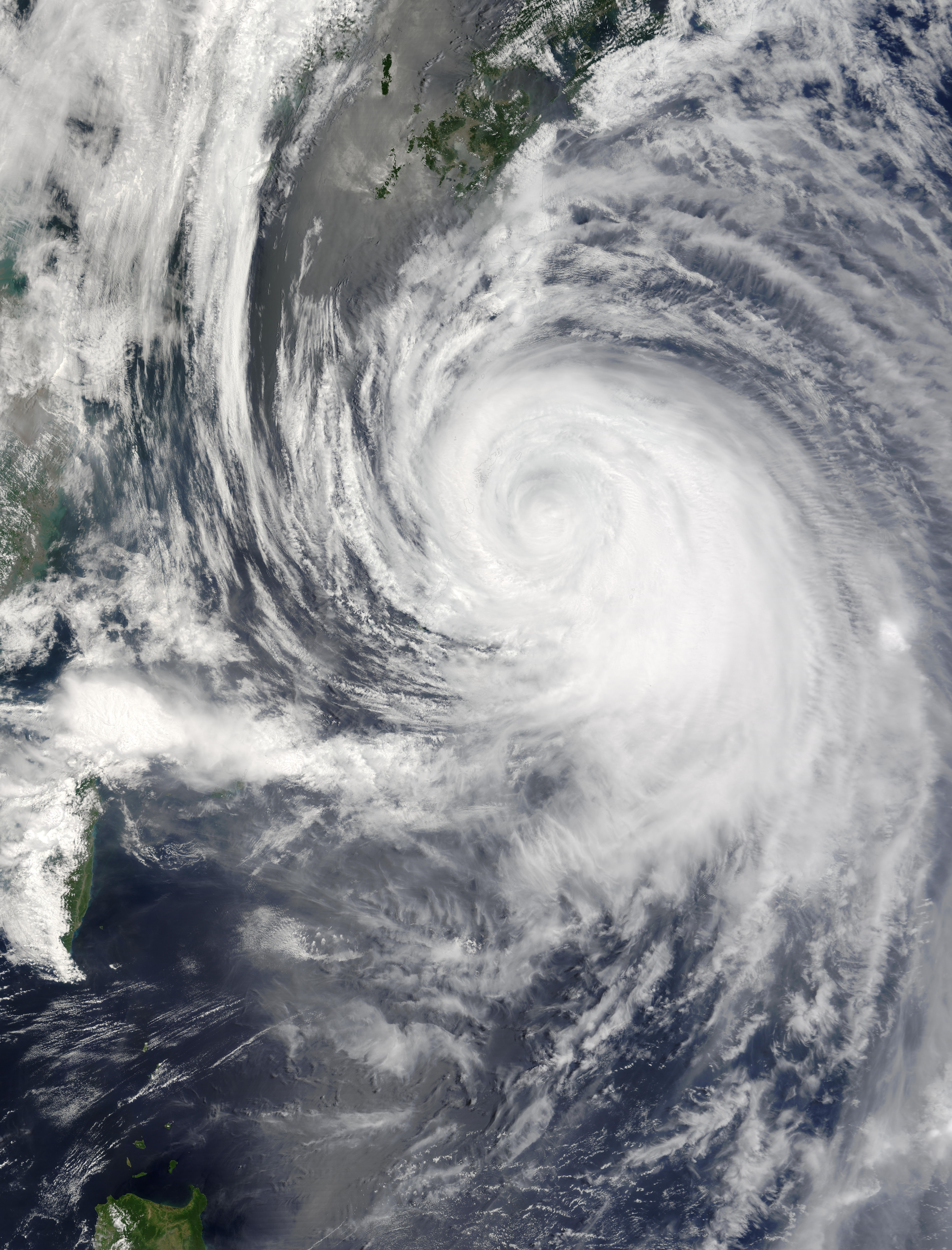
Typhoon Dianmu approaching Japan on June 20

Dianmu affected the island of Yap which was still recovering after the impact of Typhoon Sudal. The storm produced heavy rainfall, rough seas and gale-force winds but did little damage. A weather station in Yap reported a 95 km/h (59 mph) gust. Dianmu then brushed past Ulithi Atoll dropping 102.8 mm (4.01 inches) of rain over the atoll. A weather station in Palau reported 121.7 mm (4.76 inches) of rain from the Dianmu's passage. Overall, there were no reported damage from Dianmu's impact on the Ulithi Atoll, Yap or Palau.

Several stations in Okinawa and other Japanese islands reported sustained winds of at least tropical storm force. A weather station in Okinawa reported the highest sustained winds of 104 km/h (64 mph). Another weather station in Kochi reported a wind gust of 206 km/h (128 mph) during Dianmus passage. One fatality was reported in Okinawa when a surfer drowned in the rough seas.

In mainland Japan, Dianmu brought strong winds and heavy rainfall across southern, central and eastern portions of the country. A weather station in Owase recorded a 24‑hour rainfall total of 207.5 mm (8.14 inches). In Cape Muroto, a weather station reported winds gusting to 177 km/h (110 mph).

High winds from Dianmu damaged power lines which left 25,000 residents without electricity. The landfall of Dianmu also disrupted oil and crude shipments. Elsewhere in Japan, Dianmu damaged or destroyed 79 homes and flooded 18 others. Damage in Japan amounted to 6.85 billion JPY ($68 million 2004 USD, $73 million 2006 USD), mostly agricultural damage.

Dianmu's outer rainbands dropped heavy rainfall across southern and eastern parts of South Korea. A weather station in Jeju Island reported 295.5 mm (11.6 inches); another weather stations in South Korea recorded 150 - 184.7 mm (5.9 - 7.2 inches) of rain. The heavy rainfall from Dianmu resulted in moderate flash flooding as the rainfall caused the Nakdonggang River to overflow its banks. The floodwaters left two people dead and four more missing.

== See also ==
- Other tropical cyclones named Dianmu
- Other tropical cyclones named Helen
- Typhoon Etau (2003)
- Typhoon Sanba (2012)
- Typhoon Halong (2014)
