= List of storms named Lionrock =

The name Lionrock has been used for three tropical cyclones in the western North Pacific Ocean. The name was contributed by Hong Kong and refers to Lion Rock, the name of a peak overlooking Kowloon Peninsula. It replaced Tingting, which was retired after the 2004 Pacific typhoon season.

- Severe Tropical Storm Lionrock (2010) (T1006, 07W, Florita) – a moderate tropical storm that impacted Taiwan and Fujian, China.
- Typhoon Lionrock (2016) (T1610, 12W, Dindo) – a powerful, erratic typhoon that struck the coast of northeastern Japan.
- Tropical Storm Lionrock (2021) (T2117, 22W, Lannie) – a mild tropical storm that traversed through Mindanao then struck Hainan Island.

Preceded by Mindulle	Pacific typhoon season names Lionrock	Succeeded by Tokei
