= List of storms named Chanthu =

The name Chanthu (Khmer: ច័ន្ធូ, [can.ˈtʰuː]) has been used for four tropical cyclones in the western North Pacific Ocean. The name was contributed by Cambodia and means tuberose (Polianthes tuberosa) in Khmer.

- Severe Tropical Storm Chanthu (2004) (T0405, 08W, Gener) – struck Vietnam
- Typhoon Chanthu (2010) (T1003, 04W, Caloy) – struck China
- Severe Tropical Storm Chanthu (2016) (T1607, 09W) – brushed the eastern coast of Japan at peak intensity
- Typhoon Chanthu (2021) (T2114, 19W, Kiko) – A Category 5 super typhoon that caused damage mainly in Taiwan, China, and Japan.

Preceded by Luc-Binh	Pacific typhoon season names Chanthu	Succeeded by Dianmu
