= List of storms named Namtheun =

The name Namtheun (Lao: ນ້ຳເທີນ, [nam˥˨ tʰɤːn˦˥]) has been used for four tropical cyclones in the western North Pacific Ocean. The name was contributed by Laos and refers to the Nam Theun River in Lao.

- Typhoon Namtheun (2004) (T0410, 13W) – struck Japan.
- Tropical Storm Namtheun (2010) (T1008, 09W) – formed between Taiwan and mainland China.
- Typhoon Namtheun (2016) (T1612, 15W, Enteng) – struck Japan.
- Severe Tropical Storm Namtheun (2021) (T2119, 23W) – did not affect land.

Preceded by Tokei	Pacific typhoon season names Namtheun	Succeeded by Malou
