= List of storms named Nida =

The name Nida (Thai: นิดา, pronounced [ní(ʔ).dāː]) has been used for four tropical cyclones in the West Pacific Ocean. Nida, contributed by Thailand, is a female given name.

- Typhoon Nida (2004) (T0402, 04W, Dindo) – Category 5-equivalent super typhoon that passed close to Catanduanes, Philippines and affected Japan afterwards.
- Typhoon Nida (2009) (T0922, 26W, Vinta) – Extremely powerful Category 5-equivalent super typhoon that formed southeast of Guam in late November.
- Severe Tropical Storm Nida (2016) (T1604, 06W, Carina) – a Category 1-equivalent typhoon that impacted the Philippines and South China; JMA downgraded it from a typhoon to a severe tropical storm in post-analysis.
- Severe Tropical Storm Nida (2021) (T2111, 15W) – did not affect land.

| Preceded by Mirinae | Pacific typhoon season names Nida | Succeeded by Omais |
