= List of storms named Dianmu =

The name Dianmu (Mandarin: 电母, [tiɛn˥˩ mu˧˩˧]) has been used for four tropical cyclones in the western North Pacific Ocean. The name was contributed by China and refers to Dianmu, goddess of lightning in Mandarin.

- Typhoon Dianmu (2004) (T0406, 09W, Helen) – strong category 5 typhoon that struck Japan as a Tropical Storm.
- Severe Tropical Storm Dianmu (2010) (T1004, 05W, Ester) – affected South Korea.
- Tropical Storm Dianmu (2016) (T1608, 11W) – struck Indochina
- Tropical Storm Dianmu (2021) (T2115, 21W) – intensified to a tropical storm near Vietnam just before moving inland.

Preceded by Chanthu	Pacific typhoon season names Dianmu	Succeeded by Mindulle
