= October Storm =

October Storm may refer to:

- Great storm of 1987, or the Great October Storm, which struck the United Kingdom and France
- Lake Storm Aphid, which in October 2006 struck Buffalo, New York, and surrounding areas

== See also ==
- St. Jude storm, sometimes called the Oktoberstormen 2013 (October Storm 2013) in Danish
- Typhoon Songda (2016), the "Ides of October Storm"
