= Hokkaido University poplar avenue =

Coordinates: 43°4′25.6″N 141°20′16.6″E

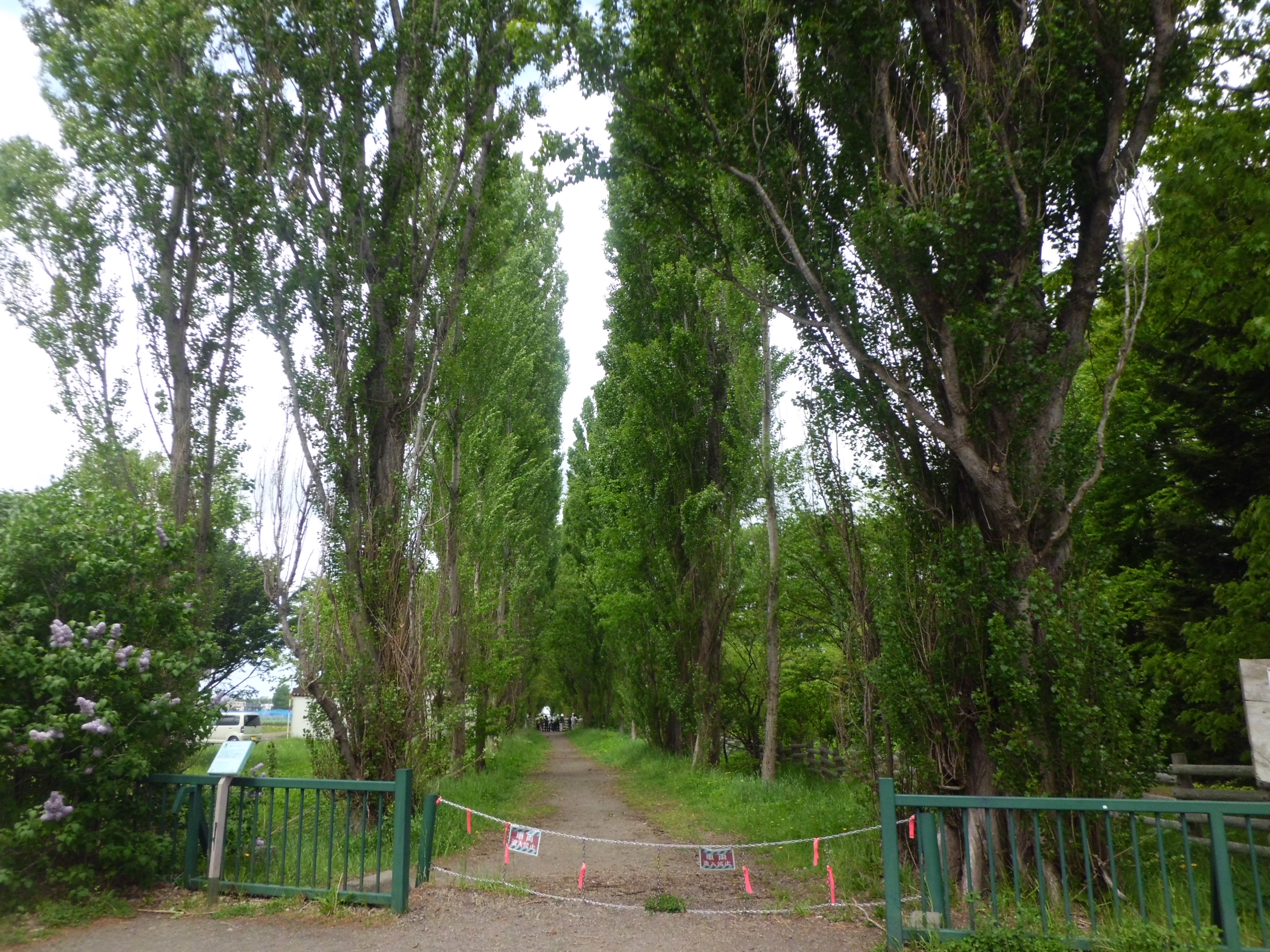
The poplar avenue in May 2015.

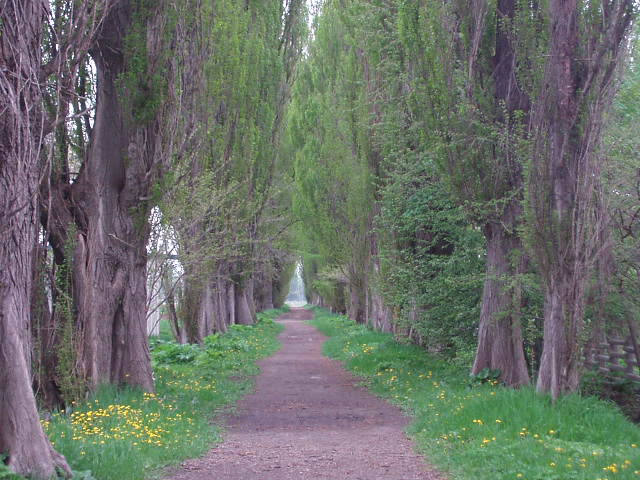
The avenue in May 2004.

The Hokkaido University poplar avenue is a path lined with poplar trees, situated in the Hokkaido University campus in Sapporo, Japan. It extends from the back of the Psychology Department to the first of Hokkaido University's farms. The avenue is a well-known symbol of the university, and is introduced as one of the three most famous attractions in Sapporo on the Japan National Tourism Organization's website for visitors to Japan.

== History ==
The origins of the poplar avenue can be found in the few trees brought back from America in 1903 by Mori Hiroshi, son of the second principal of the Sapporo Agricultural College, Mori Genzo. These trees were planted to extend the existing row of Acacia trees by Minami Takajirō, a professor at the college. In 1911, Minami accompanied Nitobe Inazō on a voyage to America. During the trip he bought several poplar trees and brought them back to Hokkaido to use as windbreaks for the college's farm. The next year, the assistant Ueda Hanjirō and the college's students planted these trees next to the existing poplars, and the poplar avenue was born.

In 1954, several poplar trees were felled as a result of typhoon Marie. A 1959 typhoon caused greater damage still, felling more than 10 trees. As a result, people called for the removal of the remaining trees for safety reasons. However, after Kingo Machimura, the Governor of Hokkaido, received a letter from a 9-year-old girl who objected to the removal of the trees, and he ordered that more saplings be planted. The poplar avenue increased to a greater size; though afterward the avenue was placed off-limits due to the risk of falling trees.

On September 8, 2004, the trees in Hokkaido University were almost destroyed by Typhoon Songda. Of the roughly 50 poplar trees in the avenue, only 32 remained (including two that were replanted). One of the trees that was still in good condition was taken to a sawmill in Asahikawa and turned into a harpsichord. New saplings were planted in places where trees in the avenue were missing, and by scattering wood chip on the path, part of the avenue was made available for public viewing again.

== Recognition ==
The poplar avenue was selected as No. 88 in Sapporo, Furusato to Bunka Hyakusen, a pamphlet made by Sapporo City for the 120th anniversary of the founding of Sapporo, and as No. 15 in section No. 1, "Road of Literature and Learning", in Kita-ku Rekishi to Bunka no Hachiju Hachi Sen, a selection of 88 historical places in Sapporo's north ward published by the north ward office.

== Bibliography ==
- Hokkaido University General Museum (2004-12-25). Reppū Ikka: Hokudai Kyampasu no Kigi. Hokkaido University Press. ISBN 4-8329-0327-6.
- Yoshinao Aoki (2006-10-30). "77 Hokudai Kōnai Kuroyuri no Gunseichi (Kita-ku Hokudai Kōnai)". Sapporo Hikkyō 100-sen. Mapshop. ISBN 4-9903282-0-5.
- Ono Yūgo (2007-12-08). Shizen no Messēji o Kiku: Shizuka no Taichi kara no Dengon. Hokkaido Shimbun. ISBN 978-4-89453-433-9.
