= List of storms named Chaba =

The name Chaba (Thai: ชบา, pronounced [tɕʰā.bāː]) has been used for four tropical cyclones in the western North Pacific Ocean. The name was contributed by Thailand and means Chinese hibiscus (Hibiscus rosa-sinensis) in Thai.

- Typhoon Chaba (2004) (T0416, 19W) – a Category 5 super typhoon that devastated Japan in 2004.
- Typhoon Chaba (2010) (T1014, 16W, Katring) – a category 4 typhoon that approached Japan.
- Typhoon Chaba (2016) (T1618, 21W, Igme) – another Category 5 super typhoon that affected South Korea and Japan in October 2016.
- Typhoon Chaba (2022) (T2203, 04W, Caloy) – affected South China and also caused an offshore crane vessel to split and sank.

Preceded by Gosari	Pacific typhoon season names Chaba	Succeeded by Aere
