= List of storms named Songda =

The name Songda (Vietnamese: Sông Đà, [səwŋ͡m˧˧ ʔɗaː˨˩]) has been used for four tropical cyclones in the West Pacific Ocean. The name, contributed by Vietnam, refers to the Black River in northwestern Vietnam.

- Typhoon Songda (2004) (T0418, 22W, Nina) – a Category 4 typhoon which struck Japan, becoming the 6th costliest typhoon in record.
- Typhoon Songda (2011) (T1102, 04W, Chedeng) – a Category 5 super typhoon which passed close to Luzon and eventually brushed the southern tip of Japan.
- Typhoon Songda (2016) (T1620, 23W) – a Category 4 super typhoon, reached its peak intensity southeast of Japan; later struck the Pacific Northwest region of the United States and Canada as a powerful extratropical storm.
- Tropical Storm Songda (2022) (T2205, 06W) – brought heavy rains to parts of the Korean Peninsula.

Preceded by Aere	Pacific typhoon season names Songda	Succeeded by Trases
