= Typhoon Tingting =

Pacific typhoon in 2004

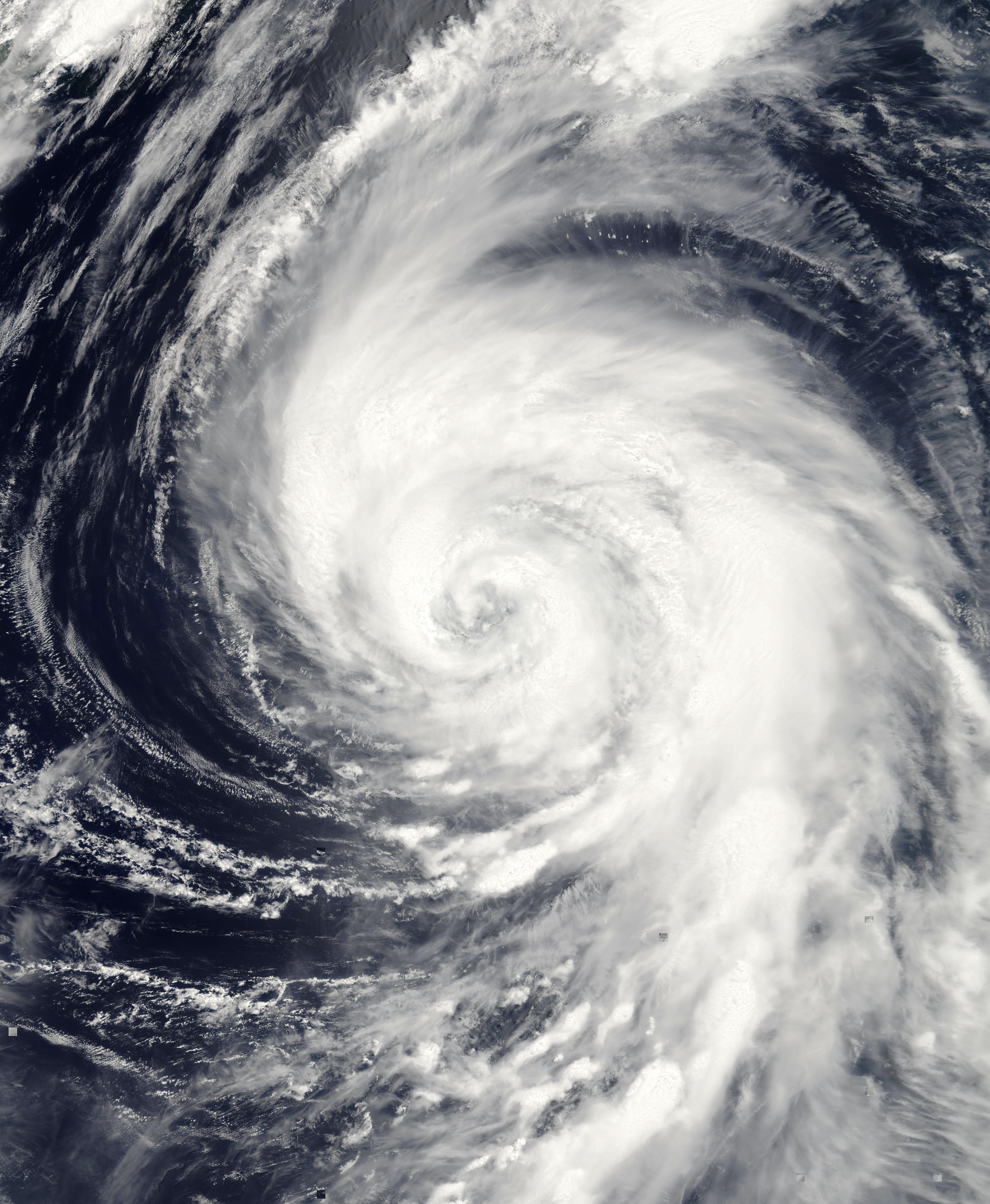
- Typhoon Tingting near peak intensity on June 30

Meteorological history
- Formed: June 25, 2004
- Extratropical: July 4, 2004
- Dissipated: July 13, 2004

Typhoon
- 10-minute sustained (JMA)
- Highest winds: 150 km/h (90 mph)
- Lowest pressure: 955 hPa (mbar); 28.20 inHg

Category 1-equivalent typhoon
- 1-minute sustained (SSHWS/JTWC)
- Highest winds: 150 km/h (90 mph)
- Lowest pressure: 963 hPa (mbar); 28.44 inHg

Overall effects
- Fatalities: 12 total
- Damage: $23.7 million (2004 USD)
- Areas affected: Mariana Islands and Japan
- IBTrACS
- Part of the 2004 Pacific typhoon season

Typhoon Tingting was a destructive tropical cyclone that produced record-breaking rains in Guam in late June 2004. The eighth named storm of the 2004 Pacific typhoon season, Tingting originated from a tropical depression over the open waters of the western Pacific Ocean. The storm gradually intensified as it traveled northwest, becoming a typhoon on June 28 and reaching its peak the following day while passing through the Mariana Islands. After maintaining typhoon intensity for three days, a combination of dry air and cooler sea surface temperatures caused the storm to weaken as it traveled northward. On July 1, the storm passed by the Bonin Islands, off the coast of Japan, before moving out to sea. By July 4, Tinting had transitioned into an extratropical cyclone. The remnants were last reported by the Japan Meteorological Agency, the Regional Specialized Meteorological Center for the western Pacific basin, near the International Date Line on July 13.

While passing through the Mariana Islands, Typhoon Tingting produced torrential rains which triggered flooding and numerous landslides. In Guam, 554.99 mm (21.850 in) of rain fell in 24 hours, breaking the daily and monthly rainfall records for June. Winds gusted up to 212 km/h (132 mph), causing significant structural damage, amounting to $6 million in losses. One fatality occurred as a result of flooding and nine others resulted from rough seas. In the Mariana Islands, 71 homes were destroyed and hundreds were damaged; losses totaled $11.2 million. In Japan, two people were killed by rough seas. (Note: All damage figures are in 2004 USD)

== Meteorological history ==
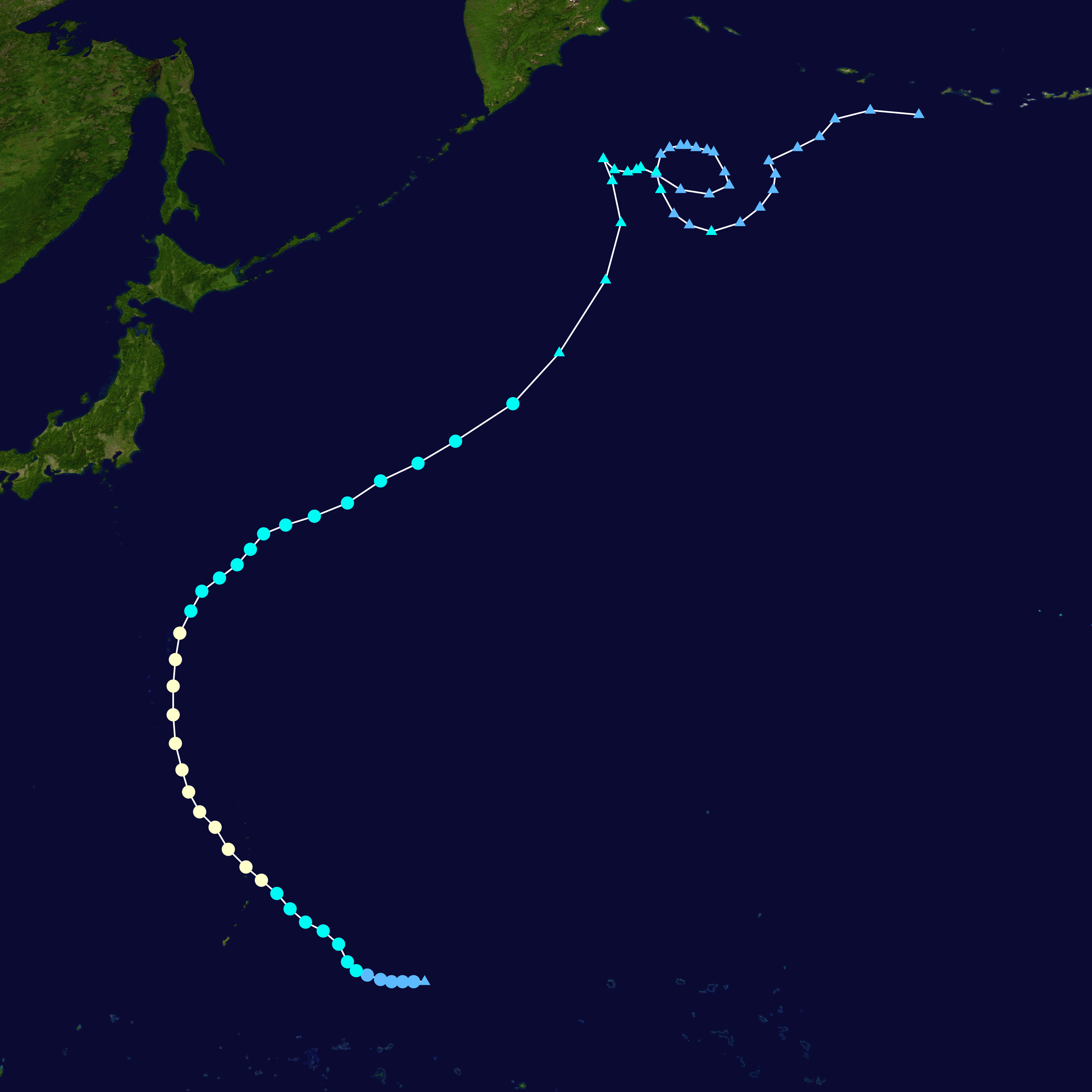
Map plotting the storm's track and intensity, according to the Saffir–Simpson scale Map key Saffir–Simpson scale Tropical depression (≤38 mph, ≤62 km/h) Tropical storm (39–73 mph, 63–118 km/h) Category 1 (74–95 mph, 119–153 km/h) Category 2 (96–110 mph, 154–177 km/h) Category 3 (111–129 mph, 178–208 km/h) Category 4 (130–156 mph, 209–251 km/h) Category 5 (≥157 mph, ≥252 km/h) Unknown Storm type Tropical cyclone Subtropical cyclone Extratropical cyclone, remnant low, tropical disturbance, or monsoon depression

On June 24, 2004, an area of low pressure associated with developing convection formed about 1,110 km (690 mi) to the east-southeast of Guam. Early the next day, as the system began to intensify, the Japan Meteorological Agency (JMA) began monitoring the low pressure as a tropical depression. With low wind shear and favorable diffluence, the Joint Typhoon Warning Center (JTWC) issued a Tropical Cyclone Formation Alert for the storm at 0000 UTC, classifying it as Tropical Depression 11W twelve hours later. The depression traveled towards the northwest along the edge of a mid-latitude ridge. Outer bands began developing around the system, although the ridge to its north restricted outflow. About 24 hours after the JMA designated the depression, the agency upgraded it to a tropical storm and named it Tingting. (Note: The name Tingting (Cantonese: 婷婷, [tʰɪŋ˨˩ tʰɪŋ˨˩]) was contributed by Hong Kong and is a feminine given nickname meaning "graceful" in Cantonese.) At 0600 UTC on June 26, the JTWC also classified Tingting as a tropical storm.

As Tingting tracked northwestward, it continued to develop outflow in all directions. The storm slowly intensified as it traveled towards the Mariana Islands, strengthening into a severe tropical storm early on June 27. Later that day, a ragged eye began to form. The ridge influencing the track of Tingting moved eastward, causing the storm to begin a gradual turn towards the north At 0000 UTC on June 28, the JTWC upgraded the storm to a minimal typhoon, the equivalent of a Category 1 hurricane on the Saffir–Simpson scale, and the JMA followed about six hours later. Several hours later, Tingting passed through the central Mariana Islands, tracking near the small island of Sarigan, while continuing to intensify. At 0900 UTC, the typhoon reached its peak intensity with winds of 150 km/h (93 mph) according to both agencies and a minimum pressure of 955 hPa (955 mbar). With low wind shear, further strengthening was anticipated as it neared the Bonin Islands. However, the typhoon began to weaken due to increasing dry air and decreasing sea surface temperatures. On June 30, Tingting passed within 95 km (59 mi) east of Iwo Jima. Later that day, the storm's eye dissipated as convection around the center of circulation weakened.

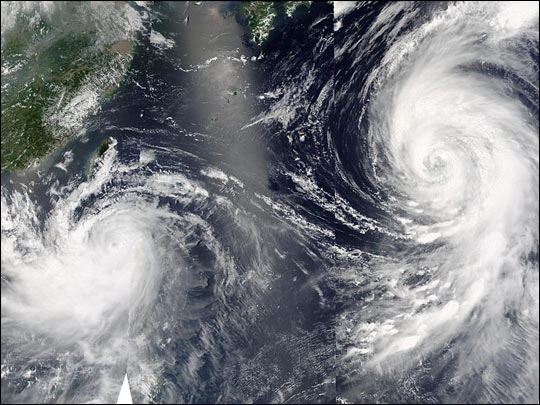
Typhoons Mindulle and Tingting on June 30

On July 1, the JTWC downgraded Tingting to a tropical storm. At 1200 UTC the following day, the JMA downgraded the storm to a severe tropical storm as winds decreased below 120 km/h (75 mph) (10-minute winds). Convection associated with the storm began to diminish as Tingting began to undergo an extratropical transition. Although the storm maintained its intensity as a severe tropical storm, it was moving into increasingly unfavorable conditions and weakening was anticipated. As Tingting tracked towards the northeast into the mid-latitude westerlies, it completed its extratropical transition on July 4. After becoming an extratropical cyclone, Tingting accelerated towards the north before abruptly stalling near the Kamchatka Peninsula. On July 6, the extratropical remnants of Tingting were absorbed by a developing area of low pressure located to the south of the former typhoon. However, the JMA continued to monitor Tingting as a separate system as it executed a counter-clockwise loop though July 10 before heading towards the International Date Line. The storm was last reported on July 13 to the west Aleutian Islands.

=== Differences among warning centers ===
The Japan Meteorological Agency uses 10-minute sustained winds for its tropical cyclone tracking information, while the Joint Typhoon Warning Center uses 1-minute sustained winds. JMA's peak intensity for Tingting was 150 km/h (93 mph) 10-minute sustained, or 160 km/h (99 mph) 1-minute sustained. The JTWC's peak intensity for Tingting was also 150 km/h (93 mph) 1-minute sustained, or 130 km/h (81 mph) 10-minute sustained. The Hong Kong Observatory also assessed Tingting to have winds of 150 km/h (93 mph) 10-minute sustained, or 160 km/h (99 mph) 1-minute sustained. However, Dr. Karl Hoarau of Cergy-Pontoise University near Paris, France proposed that Tingting was stronger than officially reported. He estimated that the storm reached peak 1-minute sustained winds between 160 and 185 km/h (100 and 115 mph) on June 28.

== Preparations and impact ==
Throughout its track, Tingting was responsible for 12 fatalities, 10 in the Mariana Islands and two in Japan; it also left $23.7 million in damage behind, $17.2 million in the Mariana Islands and $6.5 million in Japan.

=== Mariana Islands ===
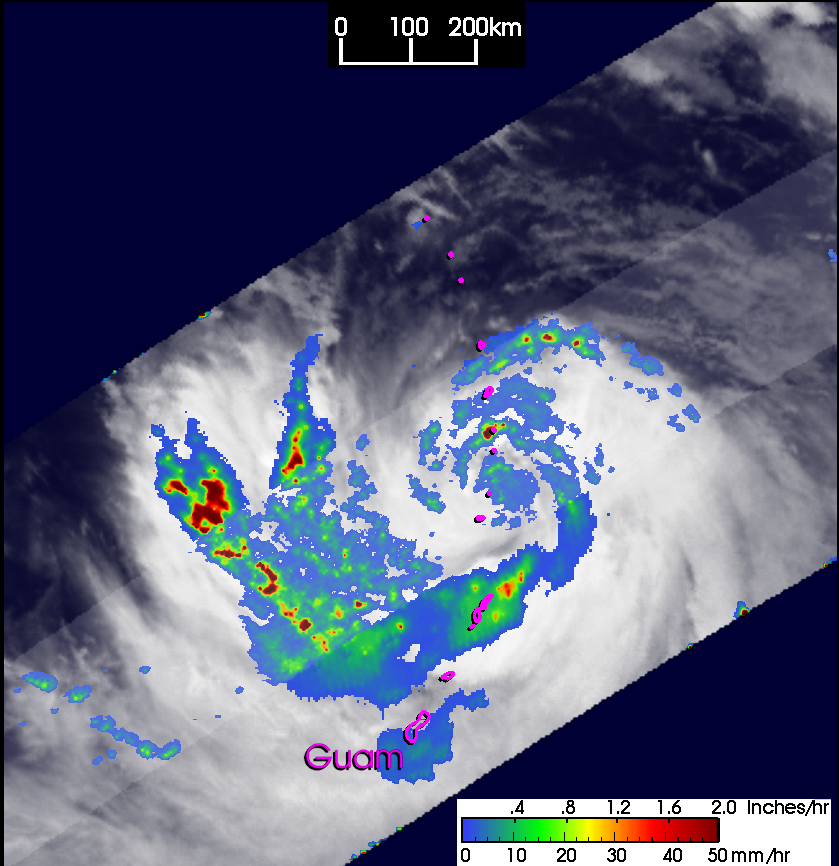
TRMM satellite image of Tingting on June 29

An estimated 300 people in Guam evacuated to emergency shelters in advance of Typhoon Tingting. Several schools throughout Guam were being used as shelters. A tropical storm warning and a flash flood warning, which were issued several hours before the typhoon warning, were kept in place for Guam until June 29. A small craft advisory was also issued for rest of the Mariana Islands. A typhoon warning was declared for most of the islands on June 27. The United States Air Force Base in the Mariana Islands was placed under Tropical Cyclone Condition of Readiness Four, the lowest level of readiness, as Tingting approached.

As Typhoon Tingting approached the Mariana Islands, three Chinese women drowned in rough seas produced by the storm in Saipan. On June 28, Tingting produced strong winds throughout the region. Sustained winds on Guam reached 82 km/h (51 mph) with gusts to 106 km/h (66 mph); a pressure of 994.6 hPa (mbar) was also recorded on the island. Although located closer to the center of Tingting, Rota reported lower winds than Guam; the highest sustained wind reached 70 km/h (43 mph) with gusts of 93 km/h (58 mph). Due to the lack of sufficient observations on Tinian, the highest sustained winds recorded were suspected to be lower than what they really were. Winds of 56 km/h (35 mph) were recorded several times with gusts to 84 km/h (52 mph). Sustained winds on Saipan were recorded up to 100 km/h (62 mph) with gusts to 124 km/h (77 mph); a pressure of 984.9 hPa (mbar) was also recorded. The highest winds during Typhoon Tingting throughout the Mariana Islands were measured on Pagan Island where 106 km/h (66 mph) sustained winds were recorded along with a gust of 212 km/h (132 mph).

Although Tingting passed about 400 km (250 mi) to the northeast of Guam, torrential rains from a monsoonal feeder band produced record-breaking rainfall. In the span of 24 hours, 554.99 mm (21.850 in) of rain fell on Guam, shattering both the record for highest single day rainfall and the monthly rainfall for June at 80.26 mm (3.160 in) and 371.09 mm (14.610 in) respectively. Most of the northern areas of the island received more than 510 mm (20 in) of rain but the southern areas of Guam reported much lower totals. At Anderson Air Force Base, a total of 287.78 mm (11.330 in) of rain was recorded over a 30-hour span. Rota recorded much less rainfall than Guam, having 145.28 mm (5.720 in) during 24 hours and a storm total of 221.99 mm (8.740 in). No rainfall was recorded on both Tinian and Pagan Island due to the lack of observations. On Saipan, a total of 197.61 mm (7.780 in) was measured.

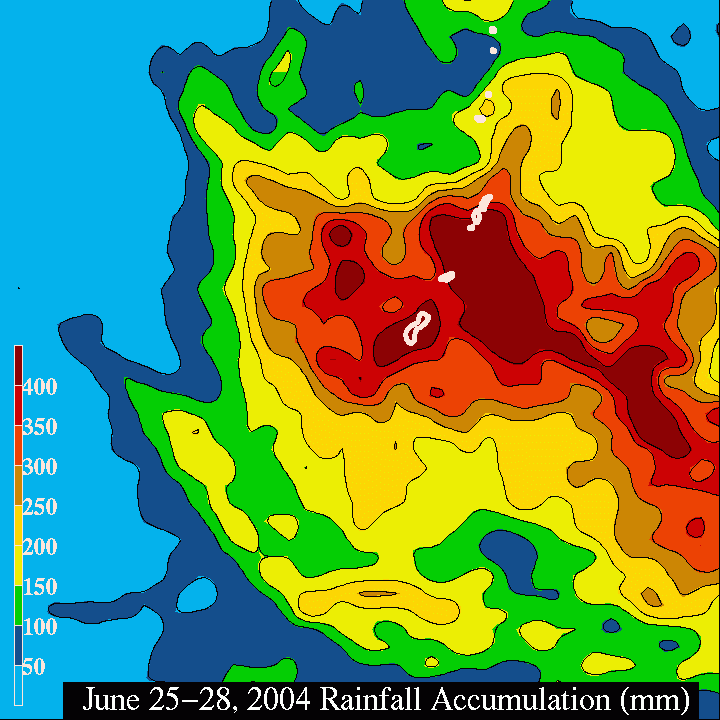
Rainfall accumulations from Tingting between June 25 and 28

The record-breaking rainfall in Guam produced severe flooding and numerous landslides throughout the island. A total of 57 homes were destroyed and another 624 were damaged. Crop damages on the island amounted to $500,000 with most of the farmers reporting total crop losses. One person died after being swept away along a flooded road. Total property damages totaled to $6 million. Most of the damage on Rota resulted from flooding and high seas. The port on the island suffered $1 million in damages and crop losses amounted to $500,000. The same day that Tingting made its closest approach to Guam, a 19-year-old was swept off a reef and drowned in rough seas produced by the typhoon. On Tinian and Saipan, unlike Guam and Rota, most of the damage was a result of the winds. A total of 4 homes were destroyed and 24 others sustained major damage on Tinian while another 4 were destroyed, 81 sustained major damage, and another 101 were affected on Saipan. Schools on the two islands sustained a combined $92,737 in damages. At Saipan's port, an oil tanker sank, spilling thousands of gallons of oil into the water.

Throughout the Saipan, 50 power lines, 20 transformers, and 6 power poles were damaged or destroyed, leaving 25 percent of the islands' residents without power and $300,000 in damages. An estimated 90 percent of the banana trees were knocked down, contributing to the $518,000 in crop losses. Property losses on the two islands was estimated at $1.6 million. On the islands of Alamagan, Pagan, and Agrihan all private homes, a total of six, were destroyed, the food stores and crops were lost, and the water supply was contaminated. The main public facility, which was used as a storm shelter on Alamagan, sustained heavy damage. Damages from the three islands amounted to $500,000. The following day, five people went out kayaking however, the rough seas overturned the kayaks and all five drowned. Numerous water rescues on jet skis had to be made as residents became stranded in their cars after driving into flooded roads. Damages throughout the islands amounted to $11.2 million.

=== Japan ===
Between June 30 and July 1, Tingting brushed the Bonin Islands with heavy rainfall and high winds. The storm dropped 105 millimetres (4.1 in) of precipitation on Chichi-jima, of which 77 mm (3.0 in) fell in 24 hours. Chichi-jima experienced the strongest winds associated with the cyclone in the Bonin Islands; sustained winds reached 65 km/h (40 mph) and gusts peaked at 146 km/h (91 mph). At 1500 UTC, a pressure of 959.4 hectopascals (28.33 inHg) was recorded on the island. The high winds produced by the storm caused power outages throughout the islands, with Chichi-jima losing power for nearly two hours. No known property damage resulted from the passage of Tingting.

Throughout eastern Japan, large swells produced by Tingting caused moderate coastal damage and killed two people. In Urakawa District, Hokkaidō, the local fishing industry sustained considerable damage, amounting to 20.5 million JPY (US$240,000). Moisture from the storm also enhanced rainfall in the Shizuoka Prefecture, resulting in a record daily rainfall of 368 mm (14.5 in) in Shizuoka City on June 29. The rains led to significant flooding and several landslides; 921 homes were flooded and an estimated 160,000 residences were without power at the height of the storm. Damage was estimated to be 540 million JPY (US$6.3 million).

== Aftermath ==
On July 9, the Government of the Mariana Islands requested that President George W. Bush declare a major disaster area for the commonwealth. Governor Juan N. Babauta reported that the islands needed at least $2.5 million to repair damages from the typhoon. The cost to repair infrastructure and clean up debris on Rota totaled $762,000. A helicopter carrying relief supplies was sent to the Pagan and Agrihan, where people had no food. The American Red Cross also provided $17,000 in assistance. The Government of Guam requested $6 million in aid from the Federal Emergency Management Agency (FEMA) to repair the damages from Tingting. On July 29, George Bush approved the request for a disaster declaration and federal aid began to be sent to the Mariana Islands and Guam. Almost a month later, the islands of Agrigan, Alamagan, and Pagan were granted public assistance. In mid-August, Typhoon Chaba caused significant damage in the Mariana Islands. A bill was passed following the storm to allow up to 500 people to be hired as temporary workers on Saipan and Tinian. In mid-September, a request was made by the commonwealth for $10 million in natural disaster mitigation following the effects of successive typhoons in the region. The funds were to be used for cleanup efforts, aid residents struggling in the wake of the storms and help reduce unemployment.

=== Retirement ===
The typhoon's name originated from Hong Kong; Tingting is a girls' given name (Chinese: 婷婷; Cantonese Yale: Tìng-tìng) from the area. It was part of a series of typhoon names that are reduplicated female, like Yanyan, Shanshan and Lingling. During the 38th session (2005) of the ESCA–WMO Typhoon Committee, Hong Kong requested that Tingting be removed from the lists of typhoon names. It would later be replaced with Lionrock (referring to Lion Rock).

== See also ==
- Typhoon Yuri (1991)
