= List of storms named Aere =

The name Aere (Marshallese: aere, [æ.jɛ.rˠɛj]) has been used for four tropical cyclones in the western North Pacific Ocean. The name was contributed by the United States and means "storm" in Marshallese. The name was originally slated to be Kodo (Marshallese: kōdọ, [kʌrʲɒ]), meaning cloud in Marshallese, but was removed because it sounds similar to the word for "vagina" (kōd) in the same language.

- Typhoon Aere (2004) (T0417, 20W, Marce), category 2 typhoon that brought severe damage to Taiwan and Eastern China.
- Tropical Storm Aere (2011) (T1101, 03W, Bebeng), struck the Philippines.
- Severe Tropical Storm Aere (2016) (T1619, 22W, Julian), struck Central Vietnam as a tropical depression.
- Tropical Storm Aere (2022) (T2204, 05W, Domeng), struck Japan as a tropical depression.

Preceded by Chaba	Pacific typhoon season names Aere	Succeeded by Songda
