= Typhoon Chaba (2004) =

Pacific typhoon in 2004

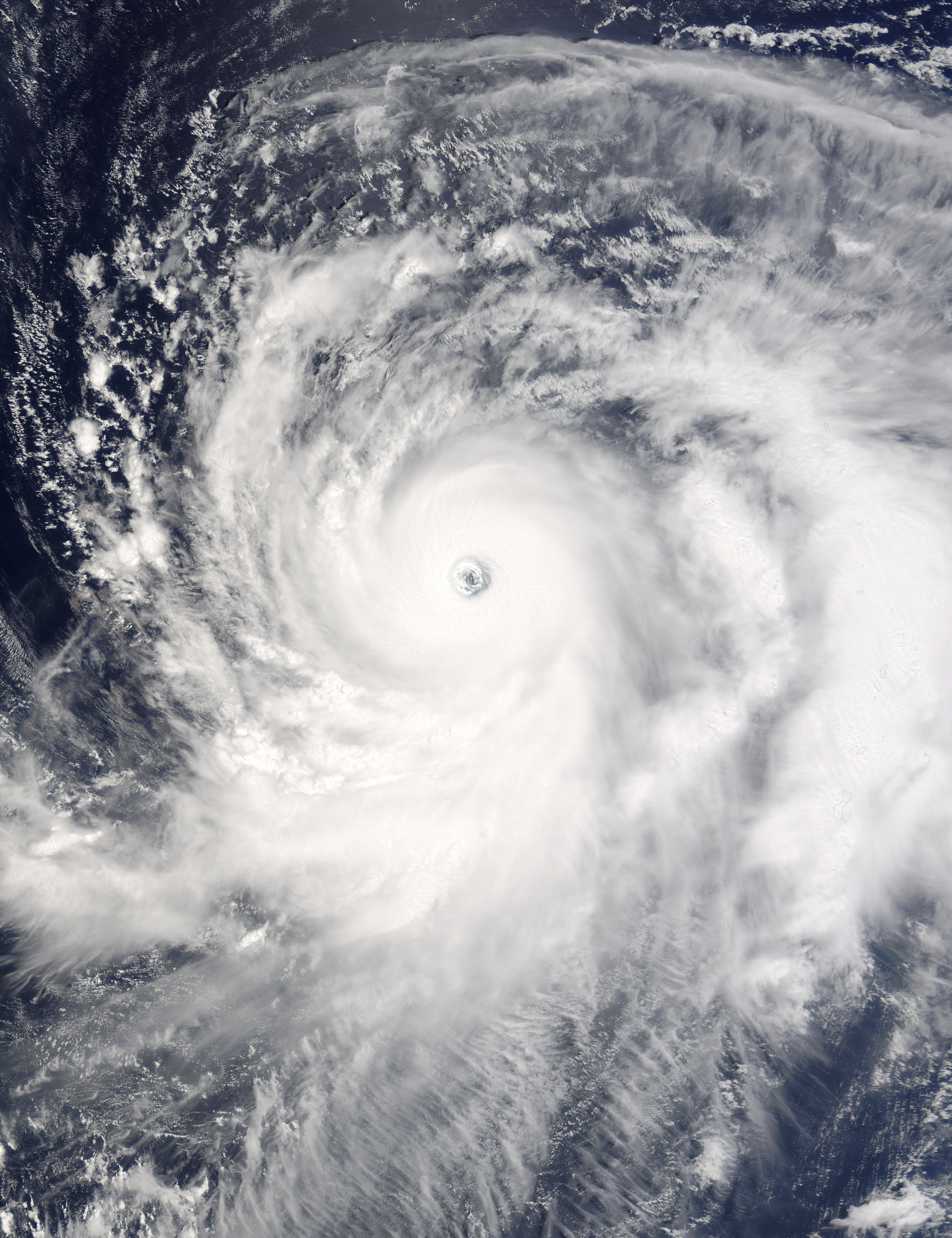
- Chaba near peak intensity on August 24

Meteorological history
- Formed: August 18, 2004
- Extratropical: August 31, 2004
- Dissipated: September 5, 2004

Violent typhoon
- 10-minute sustained (JMA)
- Highest winds: 205 km/h (125 mph)
- Lowest pressure: 910 hPa (mbar); 26.87 inHg

Category 5-equivalent super typhoon
- 1-minute sustained (SSHWS/JTWC)
- Highest winds: 285 km/h (180 mph)
- Lowest pressure: 879 hPa (mbar); 25.96 inHg

Overall effects
- Fatalities: 20 total
- Damage: $2.66 billion (2004 USD)
- Areas affected: Northern Mariana Islands, Guam, Japan
- IBTrACS
- Part of the 2004 Pacific typhoon season

Typhoon Chaba (Note: The name Chaba (Thai: ชบา, [t͡ɕʰa˦˥ baː˧]) was contributed by Thailand and refers to the Chinese hibiscus (Hibiscus rosa-sinensis) in Thai.) was the strongest tropical cyclone in the western Pacific during 2004 and caused a swath of damage from the Mariana Islands to Japan from August through September of that year. Chaba was the Japan's second costliest storm during the season, only behind Songda in September, and peaked as a typhoon with maximum sustained winds equivalent to that of a Category 5 on the Saffir–Simpson hurricane wind scale.

Chaba originated from a gradually developing area of disturbed weather on August 18, northeast of Kwajalein. Tracking westward, the system gained tropical storm strength the following day and reached typhoon intensity on August 20. Rapid intensification ensued thereafter, with Chaba quickly attaining its peak intensity on August 23 as it began to curve towards the northeast. This intensity was maintained for several hours before the typhoon began to fluctuate in strength as it began to meander south of Japan beginning on August 26. Three days later, Chaba made landfall on Kyushu, later tracking across the Sea of Japan as it concurrently weakened. On August 31, the storm transitioned into an extratropical cyclone, and later dissipated in the Sea of Okhotsk on September 5.

The typhoon caused significant damage to areas of the Northern Mariana Islands, which were buffeted by strong typhoon-force winds. Rota was worst affected by Chaba, as the island remained under the storm's eyewall for several hours. Gusts peaked at 219 km/h (136 mph) at Rota International Airport, and the strong winds damaged and destroyed a multitude of homes. Power outages were frequent across the commonwealth, and beach erosion resulted from strong storm surge. Damage in the Northern Mariana Islands amounted to US$18 million, and 13 people were injured, with one fatality. Another fatality occurred in Guam under similar circumstances, though the island sustained less damage. Following the storm, a state of emergency was declared in Guam and areas of the Northern Mariana Islands were declared federal disaster areas.

Most of the damage caused by Chaba occurred in Japan, where 18 people were killed and damage figures reached JP¥289 billion (US$2.64 billion). The typhoon remains the country's fourteenth costliest on record. A total of 8,627 homes were destroyed by the storm's effects, with another 46,561 inundated by floodwater. Impacts in Japan were primarily concentrated on Kyushu, where Chaba made its first landfall. Rainfall peaked at 821 mm (32.3 in) in Miyazaki Prefecture. Like in the Northern Mariana Islands, power outages and transportation delays were of numerous extent in Japan.

== Meteorological history ==
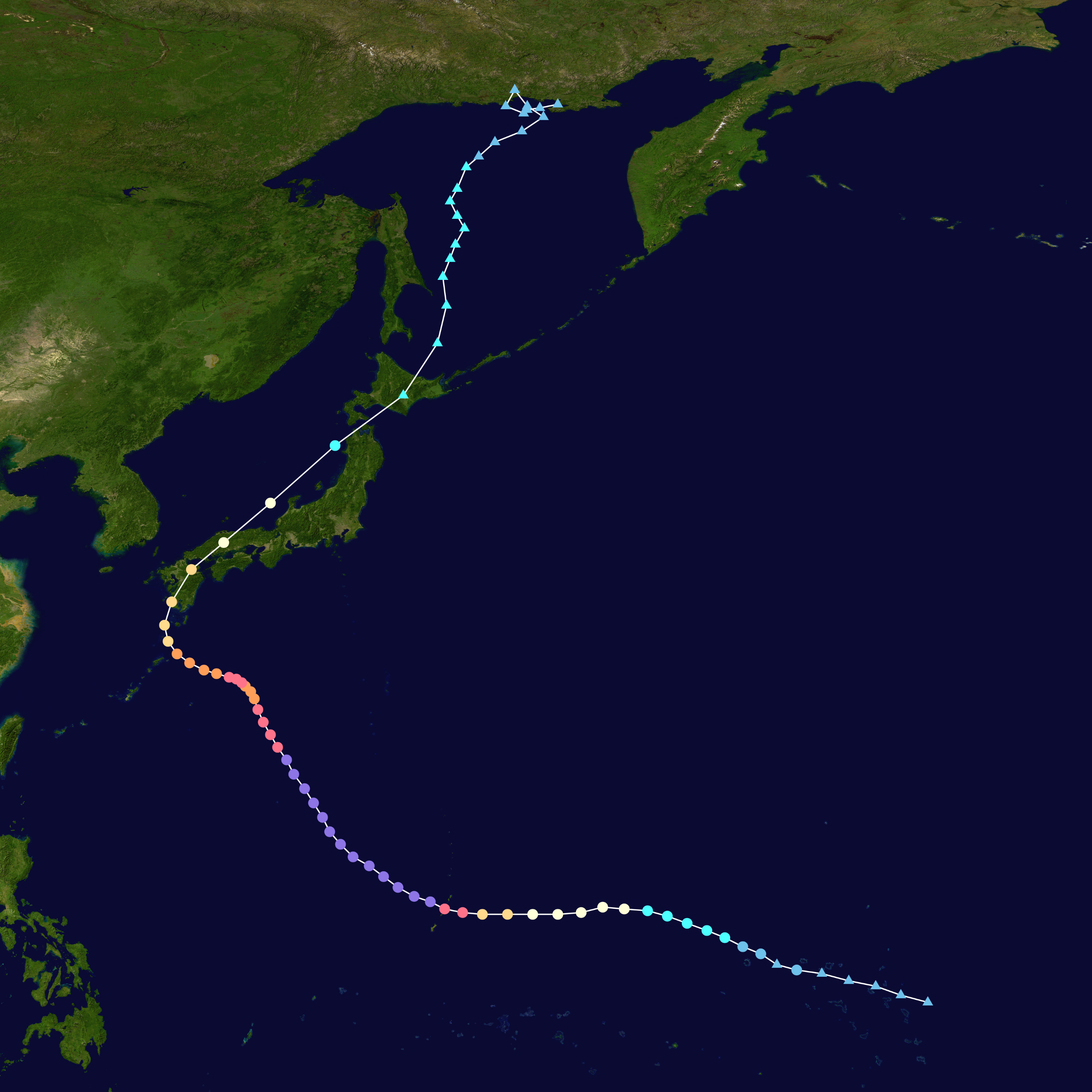
Map plotting the storm's track and intensity, according to the Saffir–Simpson scale Map key Saffir–Simpson scale Tropical depression (≤38 mph, ≤62 km/h) Tropical storm (39–73 mph, 63–118 km/h) Category 1 (74–95 mph, 119–153 km/h) Category 2 (96–110 mph, 154–177 km/h) Category 3 (111–129 mph, 178–208 km/h) Category 4 (130–156 mph, 209–251 km/h) Category 5 (≥157 mph, ≥252 km/h) Unknown Storm type Tropical cyclone Subtropical cyclone Extratropical cyclone, remnant low, tropical disturbance, or monsoon depression

Typhoon Chaba stemmed from an area of disturbed weather that quickly developed northeast of Kwajalein on August 18. Within an area of favorable atmospheric conditions, the system became sufficiently organized to be classified as a tropical depression by the Japan Meteorological Agency (JMA) at 0600 UTC that day. Tracking westward under the influence of a nearby ridge, strengthening continued and the storm reached tropical storm intensity at 1200 UTC on August 19. It was at this time that the system was assigned the name Chaba. Strengthening at a climatologically normal pace, Chaba reached severe tropical storm intensity at 0000 UTC on August 20. However, over the day's course, analysis of wind patterns about the cyclone indicated that Chaba's upper-level circulation was decoupled from its surface circulation. Nonetheless, this period of disorganization was limited, and the tropical storm began to quicken in intensification. Early on August 21, microwave imagery showed that Chaba had developed a large cloud-filled eye, signifying additional strengthening.

At 1800 UTC on August 20, the JMA upgraded Chaba to typhoon status, while the system was roughly 345 km (214 mi) east-southeast of Saipan. Much of the rapid intensification pattern was attributed to the development of dual outflow channels during the day's course. Concurrently Chaba began to curve towards the northwest around the periphery of the nearby, dominant subtropical ridge in response to an approaching longwave, sweeping past the Mariana Islands. At 1800 UTC on August 23, the JMA assessed the typhoon to have reached its peak intensity with maximum sustained winds of 205 km/h (127 mph) and a minimum barometric pressure of 910 mbar (hPa; 26.87 inHg). An intense albeit average-sized typhoon, Chaba held this intensity for two days before dry air began to impact the cyclone. On August 26, the typhoon's convection slightly weakened, and the more intense convective activity became limited to the southern and eastern sides of the system.

On August 27, the longwave trough that had in part steered Chaba northward moved out of the region, and after slowing down, the typhoon began to assume a westerly course. Chaba initiated an eyewall replacement cycle the next day, further weakening the system. A second longwave trough propelled Chaba towards the north-northeast, bringing it to a landfall near Kushikino, Kagoshima at 0000 UTC on August 30, with sustained winds of 150 km/h (93 mph). Chaba quickly crossed Kyushu and briefly emerged over water before making a second landfall on Hōfu, Yamaguchi. At 1200 UTC on August 30, the JMA downgraded from typhoon status to severe tropical storm status, and six hours later, Chaba entered the Sea of Japan. Racing towards the northeast, the storm made its final landfall as a tropical system near Oshamambe, Hokkaido on August 31 shortly before transitioning into an extratropical cyclone. These remnants persisted for several days, tracking across the Sea of Okhotsk and moving towards the coast of Russia. On September 4, the extratropical cyclone became quasi-stationary near Sakhalin before fully dissipating by 1800 UTC the following day.

== Preparations ==
=== Northern Mariana Islands and Guam ===
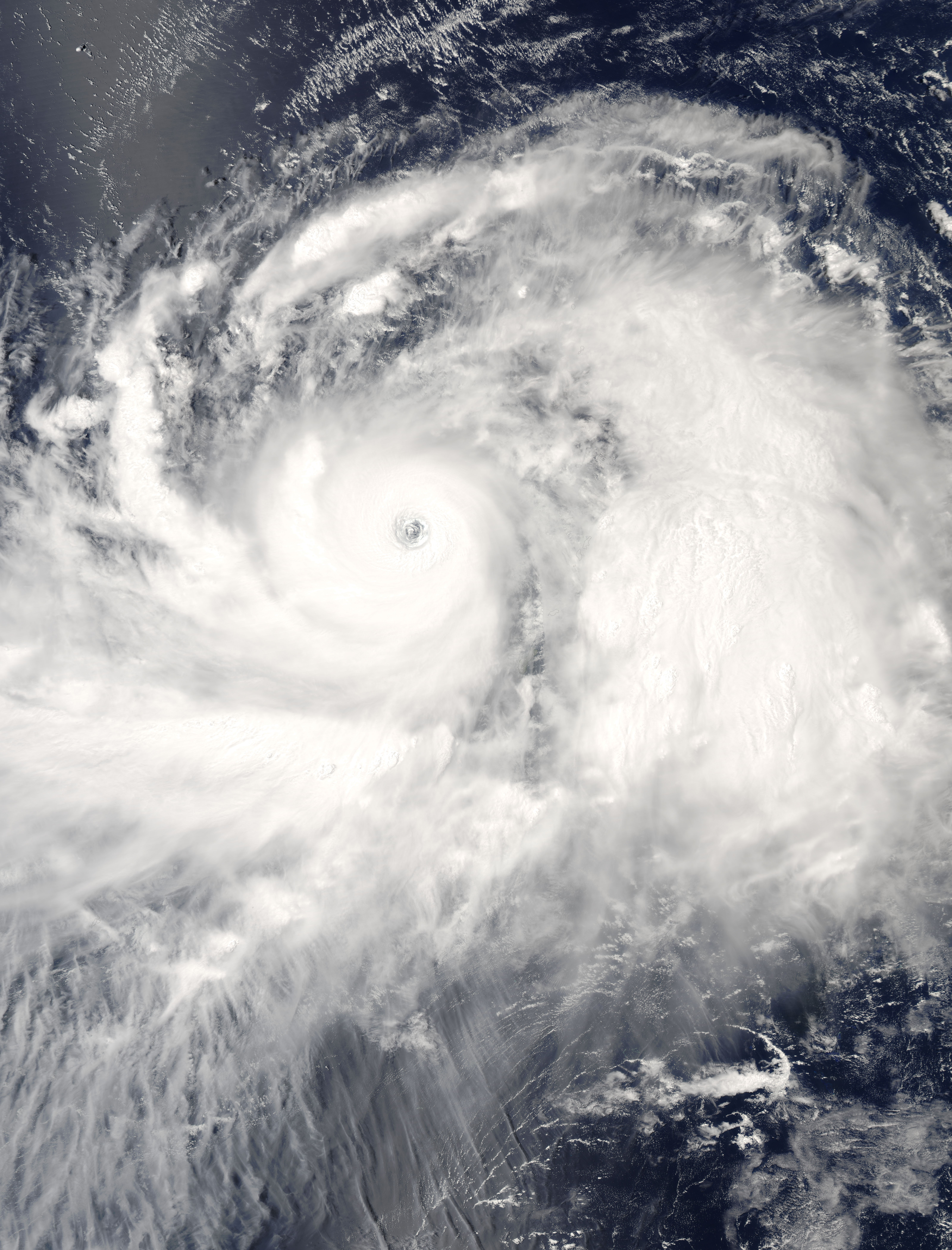
Typhoon Chaba after passing over the Northern Mariana Islands on August 23

On August 22, emergency shelters on Guam and the Northern Mariana Islands were opened in anticipation of Chaba, in response to area-wide typhoon warnings. The same regions were still recovering from Typhoon Tingting, which had caused considerable damage in June 2004. On the same day that shelters were opened, 442 people were relocated to the seven shelters on Guam. This figure rose to nearly 2,000 after ten schools were transitioned into emergency sheltering. The Antonio B. Won Pat International Airport near Tamuning, Guam was closed as part of the preparatory procedures. The USS Kitty Hawk (CV-63), which had been stationed on Guam since August 19, was forced to depart during the morning hours of August 21 in order to avoid the typhoon.

=== Japan ===
As Chaba was slowly tracking westward on August 28, the JMA projected the storm to make landfall on western or southwestern Japan the next day, and anticipated heavy rainfall across several prefectures. Sixteen ferry routes were cancelled across southwestern Japan, and 244 flights to and from airports in southern Kyushu were cancelled in response to the approaching storm on August 29, affecting about 15,000 passengers. The following day, 739 more domestic flights were cancelled, affecting an additional 60,000 people. Several express rail services were also cancelled. On Kyushu and Shikoku combined, 12,000 people were evacuated. In Onomichi, Hiroshima, 3,500 people were evacuated due to the threat of high waves.

== Impact and aftermath ==
=== Northern Mariana Islands and Guam ===
Even before Chaba passed over the Pacific islands, the typhoon generated rough surf. On August 21 on Marpi Point Field in Saipan, a large wave resulted in a fatality and caused another person to become hospitalized. As the typhoon moved through the Northern Mariana Islands, tropical storm conditions were felt in Saipan while typhoon-force winds were felt in Rota and Tinian. Rota was positioned beneath Chaba's eyewall for several hours, resulting in extremely heavy rain and strong winds. The highest recorded wind gust there peaked at 219 km/h (136 mph), and gusts in excess of 160 km/h (99 mph) were documented for ten consecutive hours. Total rainfall measurements at Rota International Airport reached 528 mm (20.8 in). Extensive damage resulted on Rota, with the complete destruction of 50 homes. An additional 175 homes sustained minor damage. At the coast, the storm surge from Chaba caused coastal inundation up to 3.4 m (11 ft) inland, resulting in beach erosion. The toppling of electrical infrastructure resulted in island-wide power outages. Similar effects occurred on Tinian and Saipan, which also experienced widespread power outages and coastal inundation. Across both islands 270 homes were destroyed and 700 others were at least partially damaged. Telephone services were also cut in Tinian. Overall, 13 people were injured and damage costs totaled to approximately US$18 million in the Northern Mariana Islands.

Guam suffered less impacts from Chaba than the Northern Mariana Islands, but was still buffeted by tropical storm-force winds. At Antonio B. Won Pat International Airport, which had remained closed through the duration of the storm, wind gusts peaked at 109 km/h (68 mph). The same airport documented 329 mm (13.0 in) of rain over a three-day period as a result of the typhoon. However, the highest wind gust measured in Guam overall was in Apra Harbor, where a station clocked a wind gust at 127 km/h (79 mph). Effects were mostly of minor extent in Guam. Despite moderate coastal inundation, beach erosion was minimal, and the heavy rainfall did not cause significant flooding. The cost of damage in Guam reached US$25,000. Four minor injuries occurred, and no deaths took place as the storm passed near the island. However, on August 25, after Chaba had begun moving away from Guam, four people were swept to sea by strong rip currents caused by the departing typhoon. Though three of the four were later recovered and treated for injuries, the other person was never found.

After the storm passed, governor Felix Perez Camacho declared a state of emergency for Guam, allocating US$250,000 in funds towards emergency civil defense, public safety, and health care costs. Several executive offices, including the Guam Office and Defense and Homeland Security, were tasked with assessing damage and assisting in repair operations. Similarly, governor Juan Babauta of the Northern Mariana Islands requested that U.S. president George W. Bush declare the commonwealth a disaster area in order to receive federal disaster assistance. This request for funding was granted six days later.

=== Japan ===
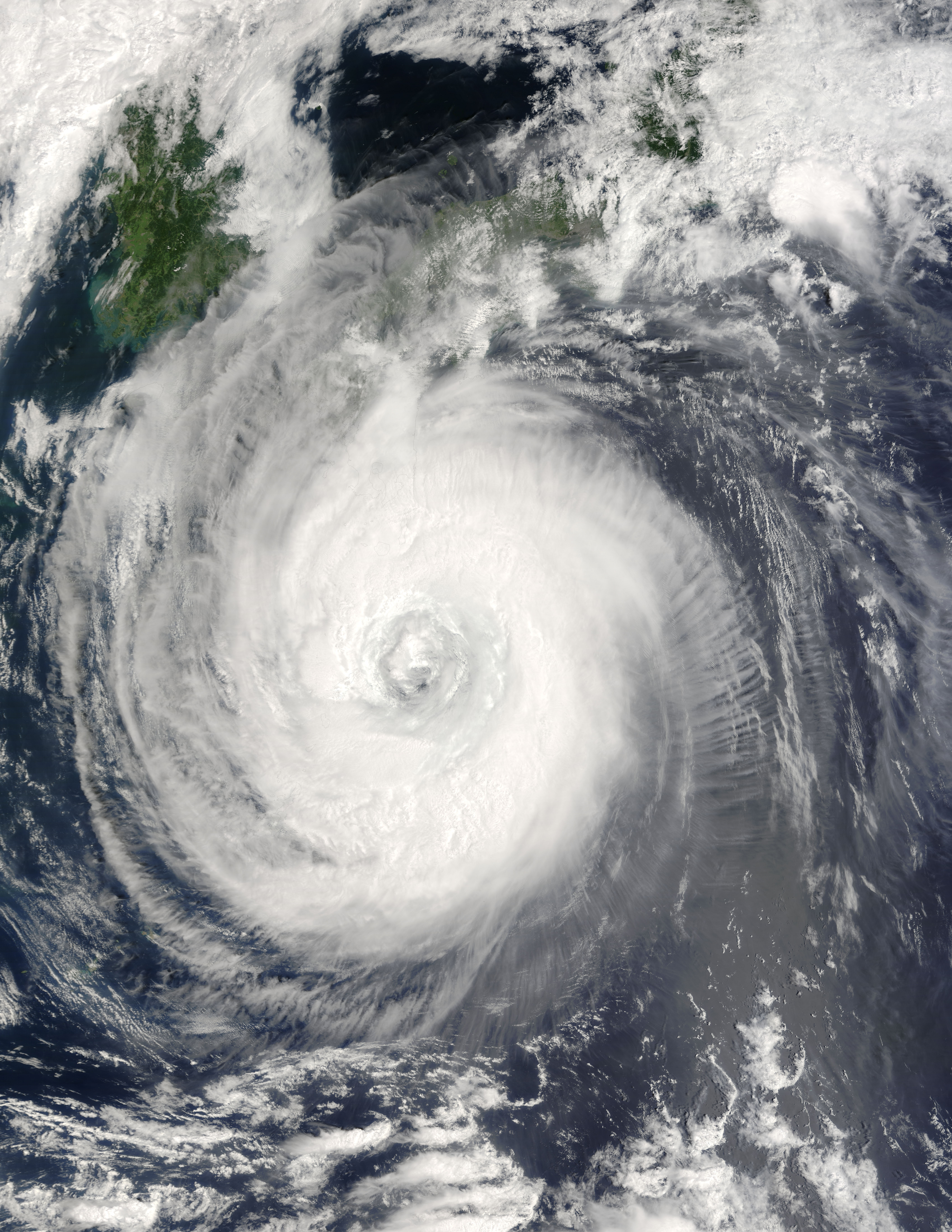
Typhoon Chaba approaching Japan on August 29

Typhoon Chaba was a highly destructive and costly storm for Japan. Across the nation, 18 people were killed, with 285 injuries; of these 45 were severe and 243 were of minor extent. In addition to the fatalities, the Japanese officials reported a damage of JP¥289 billion (US$2.64 billion). A total of 8,627 homes were destroyed, and 46,581 were at least inundated. The damage cost made Chaba the costliest typhoon to affect Japan in 2004, only to be surpassed by Typhoon Songda the following month. As of 2014, Chaba remains the fourteenth costliest typhoon in Japanese history.

==== Kyushu and outlying islands ====
Strong winds caused by Chaba damaged sugar cane crops in Kitadaitōjima beginning on August 26, resulting in JP¥39.2 million (US$360,000) in damage. Three days later, Chaba passed near the island of Amami Ōshima, producing heavy rains and strong winds. As a result of these effects, power was initially cut to 5,800 households, quickly increasing to near 20,000. Precipitation peaked at 300 mm (12 in) on the island, and one hundred homes were flooded. The strong winds blew the roof off of a house and burst windows in several other buildings. One person was injured as a result of flying glass. Similarly another person was injured due to broken glass in Yakushima.

Striking the largest part of Kagoshima Prefecture on August 30, the typhoon caused heavy losses to agriculture and infrastructure. Numerous buildings sustained damage, and 1,033 of them were inundated underwater. On August 30, roughly 32,300 homes in Kagoshima were without power, and by the next day, Chaba's impacts resulted in 328,000 homes without electricity. Damage in the prefecture amounted to JP¥5.17 billion (US$47 million), and two people were killed. The highest rainfall totals measured throughout Japan as a result of Chaba occurred in nearby Miyazaki Prefecture. Precipitation in the prefecture peaked at 821 mm (32.3 in) in Ebino. A station in Mikado observed 61 mm (2.4 in) of rain in a one-hour period, greater than any other measurement in Japan over the same time period. In that prefecture, 1,000 homes were left without power. Two people were killed and 27 others were injured. Damage figures in Miyazaki reached JP¥38.8 billion (US$354 million). The Japan Ground Self-Defense Force was dispatched in both Miyazaki and Kagoshima prefectures to rescue impacted persons and search for missing people.

In Kumamoto Prefecture, 100 homes were left without power. Roads and transportation routes became blocked due to the rains and numerous landslides. Damage there reached JP¥1.91 billion (US$17.4 million), and though no deaths occurred, there were seven injuries. Storm surge in Fukuoka Prefecture caused damage along the coast, and resulted in some inland flooding. Though being located next to the coast, Nagasaki Prefecture only experienced moderate flooding, with a few buildings becoming inundated by floodwater. Agricultural damage was much more considerable, with 5,645 hectares (13,950 acres) of farmland becoming submerged underwater. Similar effects were felt in Saga Prefecture, where damage amounted to JP¥2.21 billion (US$20.2 million). Ōita Prefecture suffered heavy losses as it was battered by both heavy rains and strong winds, affecting the entirety of the prefecture. Several buildings sustained façade damage. Impacts to rice, vegetable, and fruit production were also reported. Damage accrued in Ōita amounted to JP¥3.41 billion (US$31.1 million).

==== Elsewhere in Japan ====
On August 26, two people, one off of Kōchi Prefecture and the other off of Ehime Prefecture, were both killed after being swept away by waves estimated to have been cresting 3 m (9.8 ft) above mean sea level. These deaths occurred while the typhoon was still well into open sea. Four days later, a Vietnamese freighter, the Vihan 05, ran aground near Cape Yura in Ehime Prefecture. Initially headed for Kure, Hiroshima, four of the ship's twenty crew members were thrown into the sea and went missing prior to the grounding incident. In the prefecture itself, nearly 400 homes were flooded by heavy rainfall. Combined impacts of precipitation, storm surge, and strong winds caused numerous transportation delays and cancellations. A total of 116,453 electrical units failed during the typhoon's passage. Damage totaled JP¥39.6 billion (US$361 million), more than any other prefecture in Japan.

On Honshū, 98,014 homes suffered power outages during Chaba.

== See also ==
- Other tropical cyclones named Chaba
- Typhoon Nabi
- Typhoon Phanfone (2014)
- Typhoon Dianmu (2004)
- Typhoon Oliwa
