= Typhoon Songda (2004) =

Pacific typhoon in 2004

Typhoon Songda (Nina)
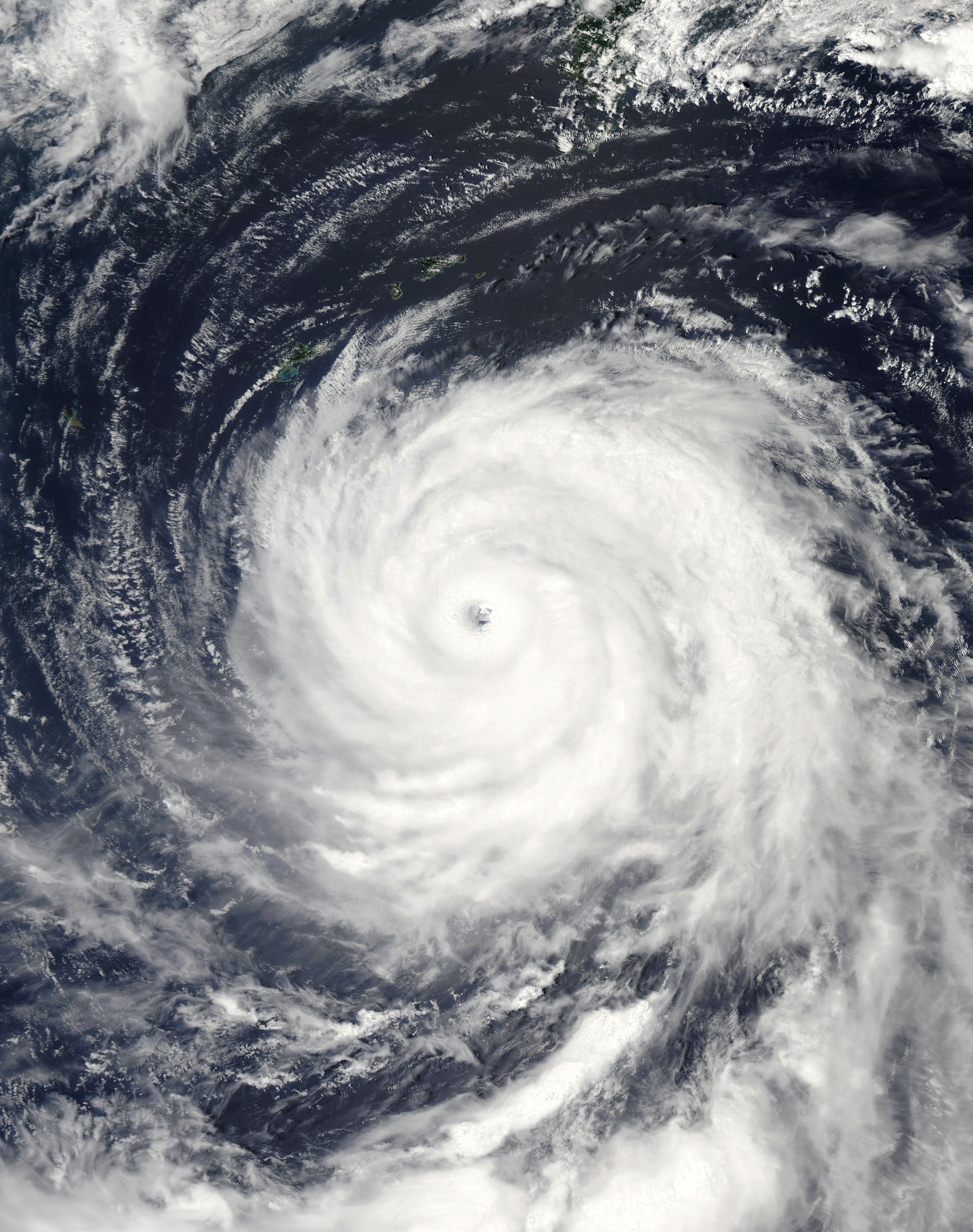
- Songda at peak intensity near Japan on September 4

Meteorological history
- Formed: August 26, 2004
- Extratropical: September 8, 2004
- Dissipated: September 13, 2004

Very strong typhoon
- 10-minute sustained (JMA)
- Highest winds: 175 km/h (110 mph)
- Lowest pressure: 925 hPa (mbar); 27.32 inHg

Category 4-equivalent typhoon
- 1-minute sustained (SSHWS/JTWC)
- Highest winds: 230 km/h (145 mph)
- Lowest pressure: 916 hPa (mbar); 27.05 inHg

Overall effects
- Fatalities: 28 total
- Damage: $9.3 billion (2004 USD) (Eighth-costliest typhoon on record in nominal terms; sixth-costliest typhoon when adjusted for inflation)
- Areas affected: Mariana Islands, Japan
- IBTrACS
- Part of the 2004 Pacific typhoon season

Typhoon Songda, (Note: The name Songda (Vietnamese: Sông Đà, [səwŋ͡m˧˧ ʔɗaː˨˩]) was contributed by Vietnam and refers to the Black River in northwestern Vietnam.) known in the Philippines as Typhoon Nina, was the sixth-costliest typhoon on record. The 18th named storm of the 2004 Pacific typhoon season, Songda developed on August 26 near the Marshall Islands. Following a path that Typhoon Chaba took nine days prior, Songda moved west-northwestward and strengthened quickly amid favorable conditions.

== Meteorological history ==
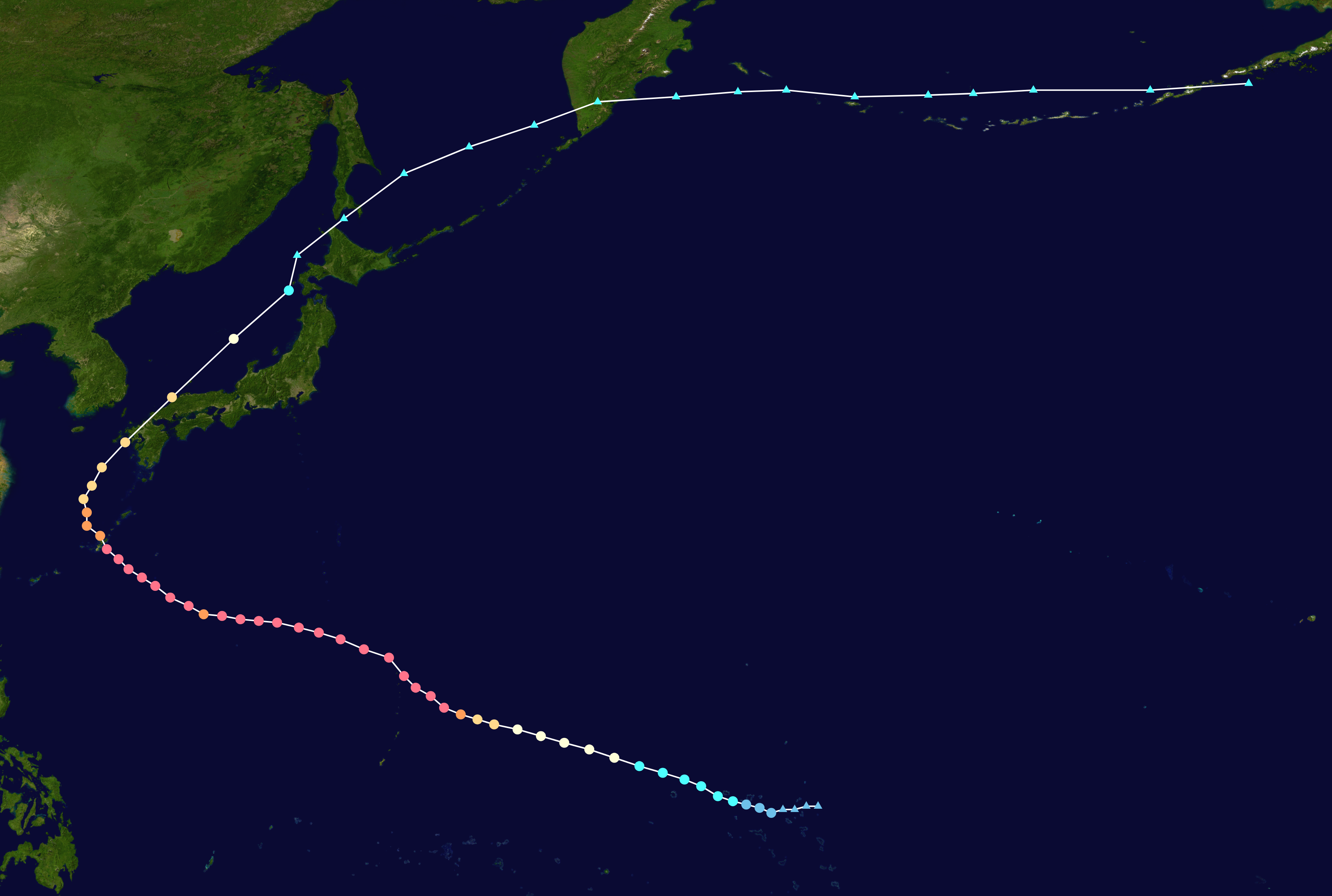
Map plotting the storm's track and intensity, according to the Saffir–Simpson scale Map key Saffir–Simpson scale Tropical depression (≤38 mph, ≤62 km/h) Tropical storm (39–73 mph, 63–118 km/h) Category 1 (74–95 mph, 119–153 km/h) Category 2 (96–110 mph, 154–177 km/h) Category 3 (111–129 mph, 178–208 km/h) Category 4 (130–156 mph, 209–251 km/h) Category 5 (≥157 mph, ≥252 km/h) Unknown Storm type Tropical cyclone Subtropical cyclone Extratropical cyclone, remnant low, tropical disturbance, or monsoon depression

Forming in a similar region as Typhoon Chaba did nine days earlier, Typhoon Songda originated on August 26 from an area of convection, or thunderstorms, east-northeast of Kwajalein in the Marshall Islands. At 06:00 UTC that day, the Japan Meteorological Agency (JMA) assessed that a tropical depression developed. The convection steadily organized and consolidated into rainbands around a well-developed circulation, aided by low wind shear. At 11:30 UTC on August 28, the Joint Typhoon Warning Center issued a tropical cyclone formation alert, and just 30 minutes later upgraded the system to Tropical Depression 22W.

Favorable conditions allowed the nascent system to quickly intensify. At 00:00 UTC on August 28, the JMA upgraded the depression to a tropical storm, naming it Songda. Moving west-northwestward around the subtropical ridge to the north, the storm passed north of the Marshall Islands. An eye began becoming visible on satellite imagery on August 29, prompting the JTWC to upgrade Songda to typhoon status at 12:00 UTC that day. A day later, the JMA also upgraded the storm to typhoon status, and the agency estimated an initial peak intensity on August 31 of 165 km/h (105 mph). That day, the JTWC also estimated peak 1 minute winds of 230 km/h (145 mph), equivalent to a Category 4 on the Saffir-Simpson scale. Operationally, the JTWC estimated slightly higher winds and assessed Songda as a "super typhoon", but it was revised downward.

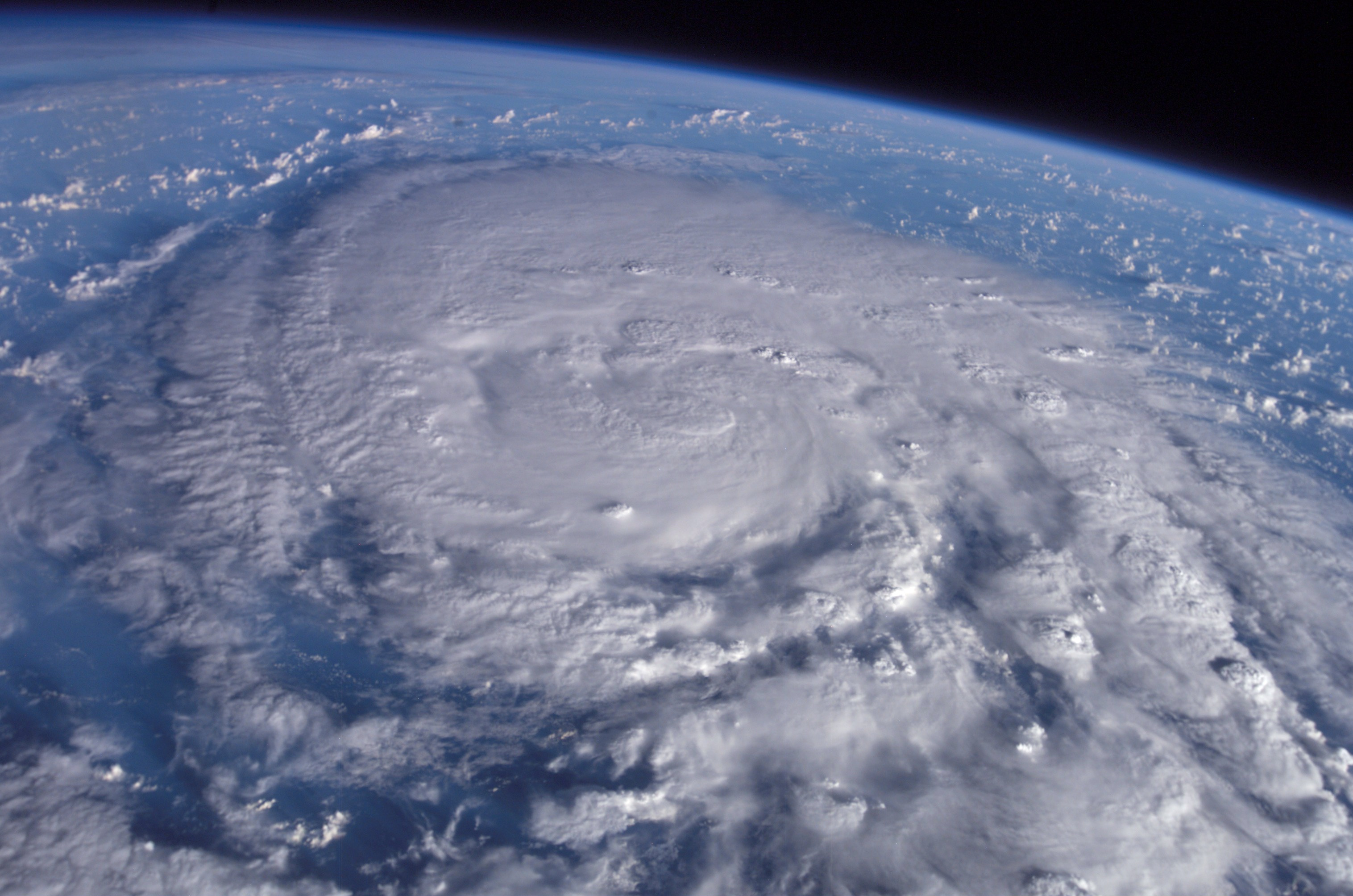
Typhoon Songda on September 4, 2004, as seen from the International Space Station

The typhoon increased in size as it approached the Northern Marianas Islands (CNMI), which was struck by Typhoon Chaba a week prior. On August 31, Songda turned more to the northwest, which spared the more populated islands of Saipan and Tinian. On September 1, the storm passed about 32 km (20 mi) northeast of Agrihan with 1 minute winds estimated at 233 km/h (145 mph). Subsequently, the typhoon turned more to the west-northwest and weakened slightly. However, an increase in northward outflow caused the convection to deepen, resulting in Songda re-intensifying. On September 4, the JTWC again estimated peak 1 minute winds of 230 km/h (145 mph), and the JMA assessed a peak 10 minute wind peak of 175 km/h (110 mph). Around that time, Songda had turned to the northwest and had developed a symmetric eyewall. At 08:00 UTC on September 5, the typhoon made landfall on the Japanese island of Okinawa while at peak intensity.

A break in the ridge steered Songda northward after the storm struck Okinawa. The storm gradually weakened, partly due to drier air, and accelerated northeastward on September 6 toward western Japan. At 00:00 UTC on September 7, Songda made landfall on Nagasaki in western Kyushu with 10 minute winds of 140 km/h (85 mph). Influenced by an approaching shortwave trough, the storm raced into the Sea of Japan and weakened to tropical storm status. Late on September 7, the JTWC issued their last advisory on Songda, noting that the storm was becoming extratropical. The JMA declared Songda as fully extratropical at 00:00 UTC the next day while the storm was just west of Hokkaido; at that time, the storm merged with a nearby non-tropical low and a cold front. After a brief turn to the north, the storm moved northeastward over northern Hokkaido and southern Sakhalin and entered the Sea of Okhotsk. On September 9, the remnants of Songda moved across the southern Kamchatka Peninsula before moving into the Bering Sea. Late on September 10, the JMA stopped tracking the storm after Songda crossed the 180th meridian. The storm continued eastward, entering the Gulf of Alaska on September 11. Two days later, the system moved inland after weakening further.

== Impact ==
Early in its duration, Songda passed northeast of Enewetak Atoll in the Marshall Islands, producing gale-force sustained winds and typhoon-force gusts.

Ahead of the storm's passage, a typhoon watch was issued for Agrihan. Moving through the CNMI as a powerful typhoon, Songda largely spared the more populated islands in the south. The center passed about 310 km (190 mi) of Saipan – the commonwealth's center of population. On the island, wind gusts peaked at 61 km/h (38 mph), and rainfall reached 64 mm (2.5 in). Similar conditions occurred on Rota and Tinian to the south, with a peak gust of 79 km/h (49 mph) on Rota. On Pagan Island, Songda produced wind gusts of 174 km/h (108 mph) as well as 98 mm (3.84 in) of rainfall. Typhoon-force winds also affected Agrihan and Alamagan. In the northern islands of the CNMI, Songda destroyed all of the homes while defoliating the coconut and breadfruit trees. Damage was estimated at $500,000 (USD).

On September 3, the storm came close enough to the Philippines to warrant monitoring from PAGASA, (Note: PAGASA stands for the Philippine Atmospheric, Geophysical and Astronomical Services Administration) which named the storm Nina. Monsoon-induced rainfall from Songda, in conjunction with Typhoon Aere in the South China Sea, caused flooding in portions of the Philippines. This led to landslides and traffic accidents, as well as eight deaths.

The outskirts of the typhoon dropped heavy rainfall in South Korea, with a peak 24-hour total of 112 mm (4.4 in) on the offshore island of Ulleungdo. On the mainland, Pohang recorded 110.5 mm (4.35 in) of rainfall over 24 hours. Damage in the country was estimated at $250 million (USD).

=== Japan ===
Costliest known Pacific typhoons (adjusted for inflation)
Rank	Typhoon	Season	Damage (2025 USD)
1	4 Doksuri	2023	$30.1 billion
2	4 Mireille	1991	$23.6 billion
3	5 Hagibis	2019	$21.8 billion
4	5 Saomai	2000	$17.3 billion
5	5 Jebi	2018	$16.7 billion
6	4 Songda	2004	$15.9 billion
7	5 Yagi	2024	$15.1 billion
8	2 Fitow	2013	$14.4 billion
9	4 Faxai	2019	$12.6 billion
10	4 Tokage	2004	$12.1 billion

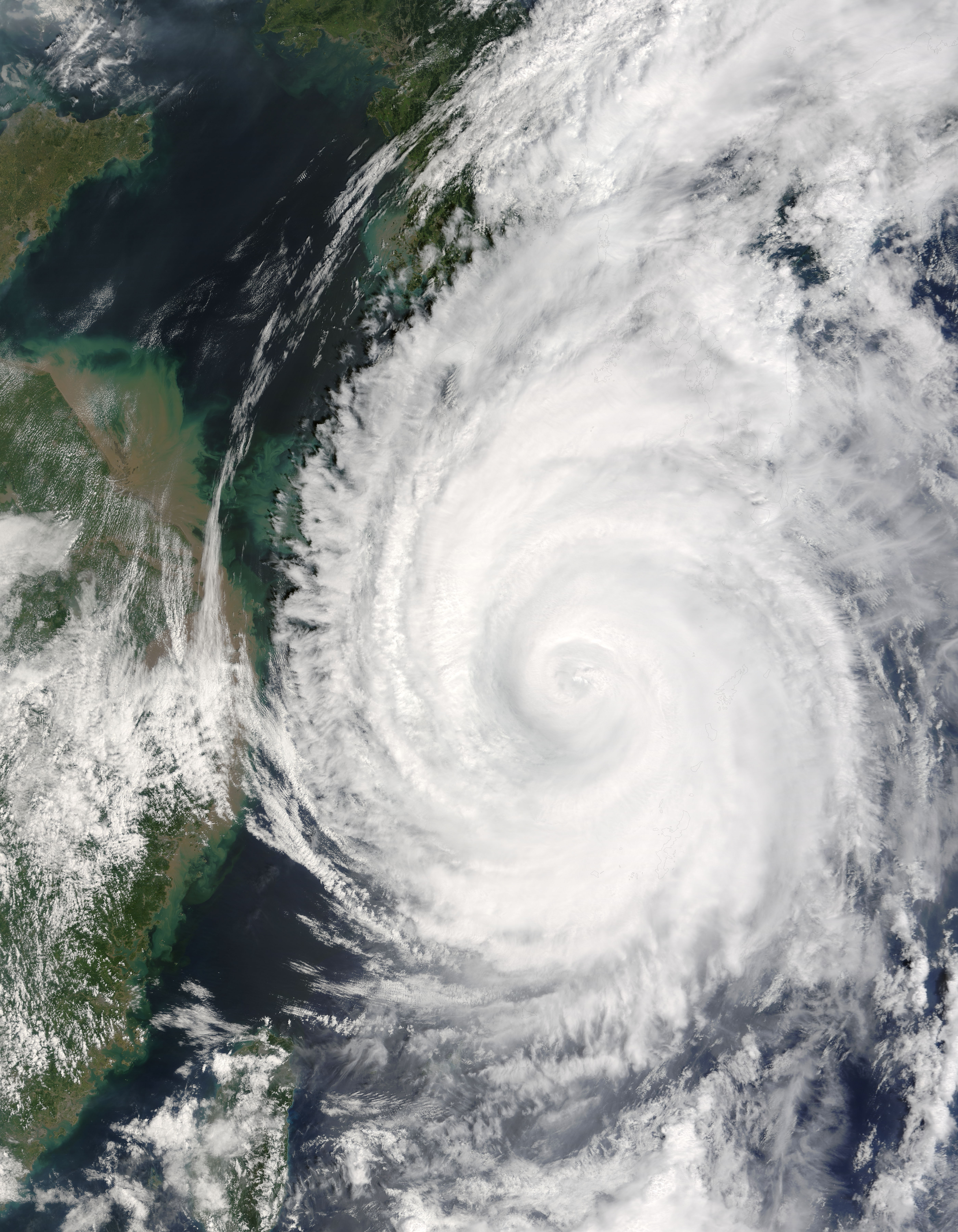
Typhoon Songda approaching Japan on September 6

Typhoon Songda was the seventh of ten typhoons to strike the Japanese mainland during 2004, the most typhoon landfalls since the JMA began keeping records in 1951. Its track across Kyushu into the Sea of Japan brought the strongest winds to most of Japan, peaking at 144 km/h (89 mph) in Seto, Ehime on western Shikoku. While the storm was near Okinawa, it produced a 1200 km (745 mi) plume of moisture that spread northward across Japan. In some places, the rains were enhanced by mountains, a process known as orographic lift. The heaviest rainfall from Songda was 905 mm (35.6 in) in Morotsuka, Miyazaki on Kyushu, of which 513 mm (20.2 in) was reported in 24 hours. Significant rainfall totals occurred in short periods of time, including 78 mm (3.1 in) in Soeda, Fukuoka. The heaviest damage was on Kyushu and western Honshu. The high winds damaged many roofs, including that of newer public buildings, which accounted for a large portion of the damage. Flooding affected 8,360 houses, and 42,183 homes sustained damage during the storm, of which 109 were completely destroyed. In addition to housing damage, Songda wrecked 104 ha (260 acres) of crop fields and damaged 1,592 ships. Overall, the typhoon killed 47 people in Japan and injured another 1,364, 205 of them severely. Damage nationwide were about JP¥126.2 billion (US$1.15 billion) .

The typhoon first passed near Okinawa Prefecture. Nago recorded a minimum pressure of 924.4 mbar (27.30 inHg), which was the lowest recorded during the storm's duration. Minamidaitōjima to the east of Okinawa registered a peak wind gust of 190 km/h (118 mph). Songda also dropped heavy rainfall on the island, peaking at 351 mm (13.8 in) on Mount Yonaha. High waves flooded six houses and inundated several roads, and one roof was damaged. Across the prefecture, 152 people evacuated, while air and sea travel was halted. The storm injured 16 people, one seriously, and left JP¥880 million (US$8 million) in damage, mostly sugar cane losses.

In Nagasaki, the winds damaged the roof of a high school. A factory was damaged in Ōmuta, Fukuoka.

Along western Honshu, Songda damaged the Yamaguchi Center for Arts and Media and the Kirara Genki Dome in Yamaguchi Prefecture. Winds and strong waves heavily damaged the Itsukushima Shrine, a structure over water in Hiroshima that dates back to the 14th century.

The storm restrengthened while over the Sea of Japan, causing additional heavy damage by the time it reached Hokkaido. High wind gusts knocked down trees and sign posts. There, about 0.1% of the houses were damaged. High winds damaged the roof of a high school in Ebetsu.

== Aftermath ==
The high damage across Japan caused insurance companies to pay $4 billion (USD) to policy holders.

== See also ==
- Other tropical cyclones named Songda
- Other tropical cyclones named Nina
- Typhoon Mireille – second costliest Pacific typhoon on record, also struck Japan in 1991
