= Typhoon Songda (2016) =

Pacific typhoon in 2016

Typhoon Songda Ides of October storm
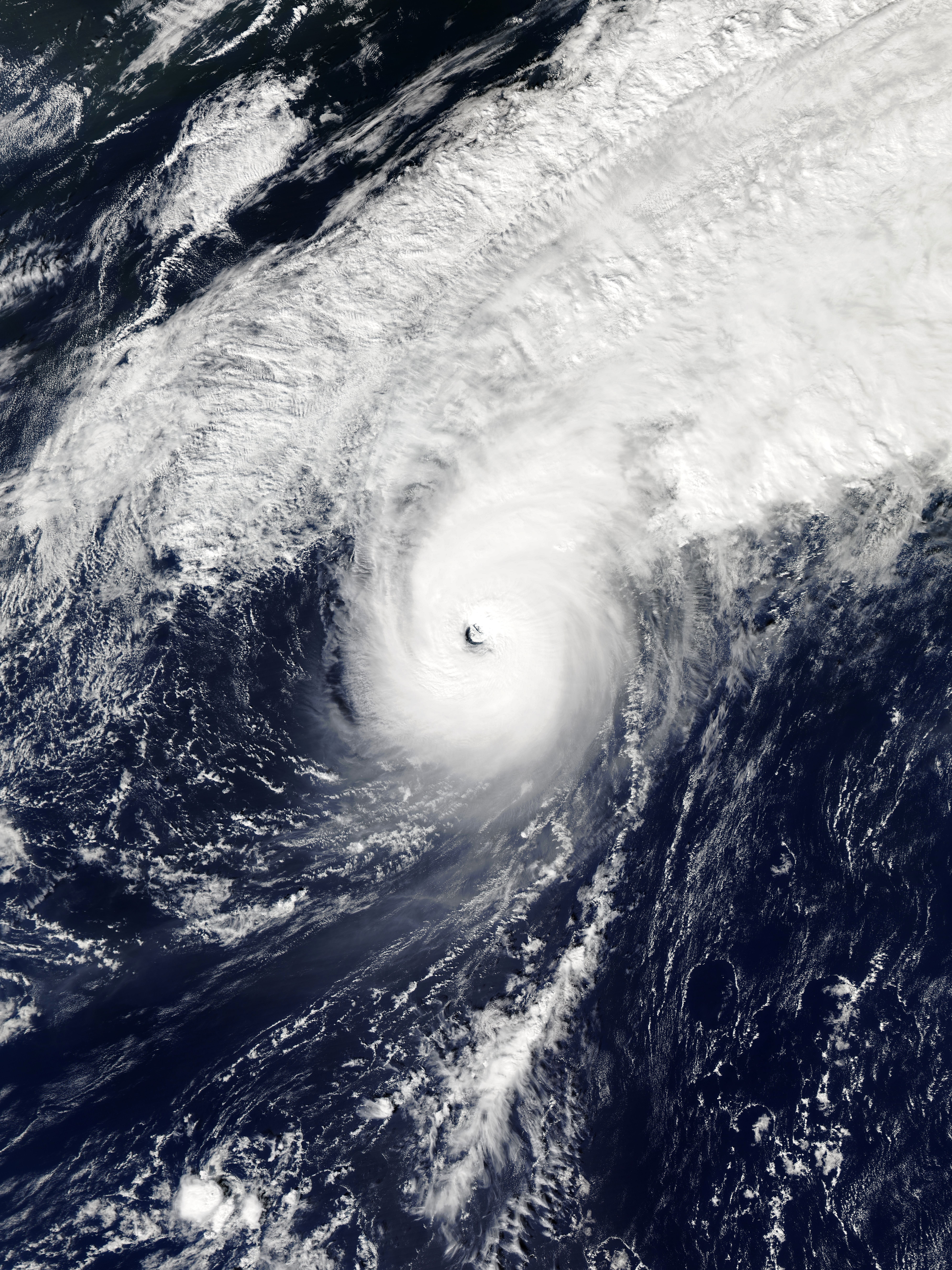
- Typhoon Songda shortly after peak intensity on October 12

Meteorological history
- Formed: October 3, 2016
- Extratropical: October 13, 2016
- Dissipated: October 16, 2016

Very strong typhoon
- 10-minute sustained (JMA)
- Highest winds: 185 km/h (115 mph)
- Lowest pressure: 925 hPa (mbar); 27.32 inHg

Category 4-equivalent super typhoon
- 1-minute sustained (SSHWS/JTWC)
- Highest winds: 240 km/h (150 mph)
- Lowest pressure: 926 hPa (mbar); 27.34 inHg

Overall effects
- Fatalities: None
- Damage: Unknown
- Areas affected: Pacific Northwest
- IBTrACS
- Part of the 2016 Pacific typhoon season

Typhoon Songda (Note: The name Songda (Vietnamese: Sông Đà, [səwŋ͡m˧˧ ʔɗaː˨˩]) was contributed by Vietnam and refers to the Black River in northwestern Vietnam.) was the sixth most intense tropical cyclone of the Northwest Pacific Ocean in 2016. Also known as the Ides of October storm, it struck the Pacific Northwest region of the United States and Canada as a powerful extratropical cyclone. Songda was the twentieth named storm and the ninth typhoon of the annual typhoon season. The system developed into a tropical storm south of Minamitorishima on October 8 and strengthened into a typhoon on October 10. Songda reached its peak intensity southeast of Japan late on October 11 at an unusually high latitude, before it became extratropical on October 13.

== Meteorological history ==
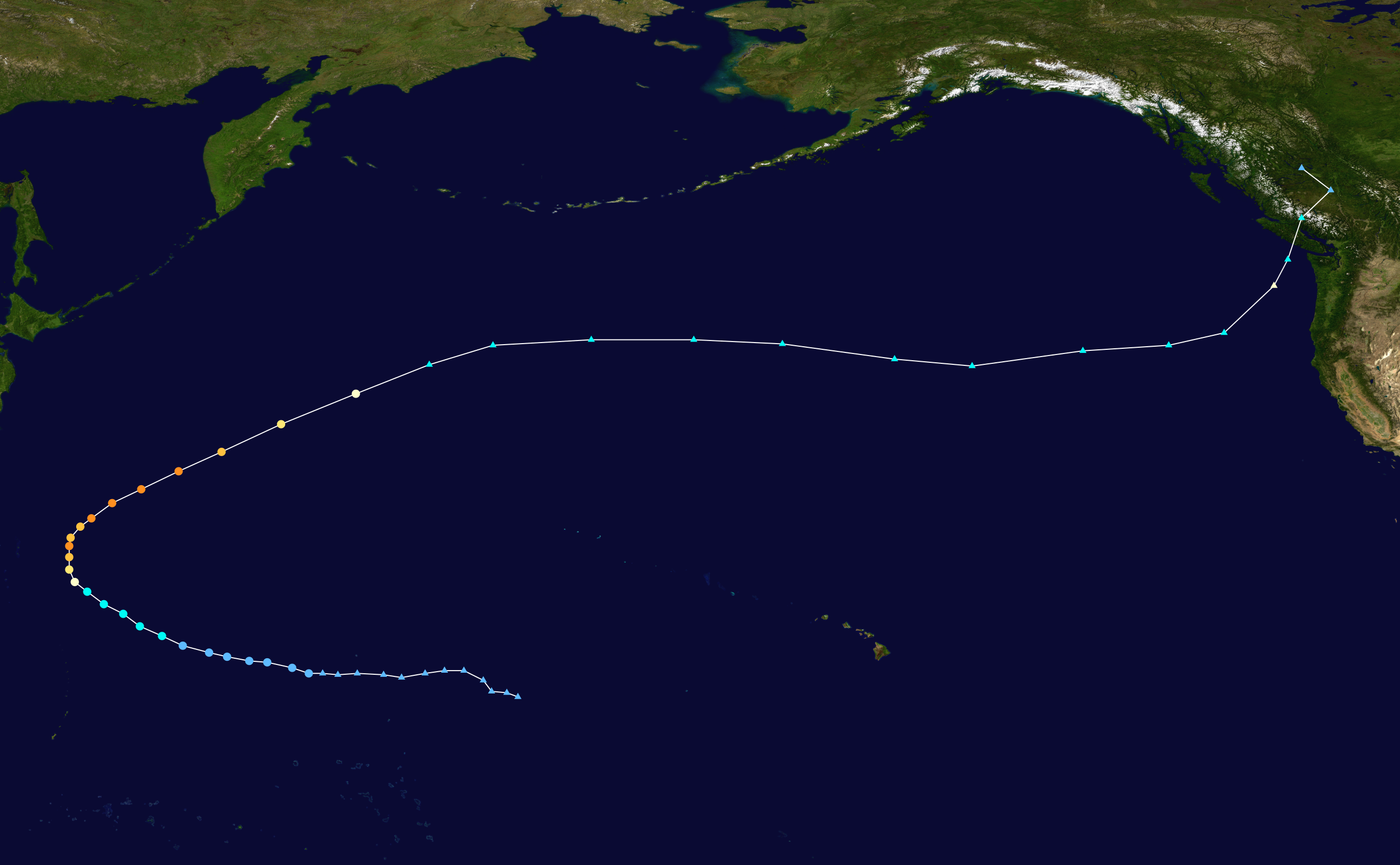
Map plotting the storm's track and intensity, according to the Saffir–Simpson scale Map key Saffir–Simpson scale Tropical depression (≤38 mph, ≤62 km/h) Tropical storm (39–73 mph, 63–118 km/h) Category 1 (74–95 mph, 119–153 km/h) Category 2 (96–110 mph, 154–177 km/h) Category 3 (111–129 mph, 178–208 km/h) Category 4 (130–156 mph, 209–251 km/h) Category 5 (≥157 mph, ≥252 km/h) Unknown Storm type Tropical cyclone Subtropical cyclone Extratropical cyclone, remnant low, tropical disturbance, or monsoon depression

On October 2, the United States Central Pacific Hurricane Center started to monitor a weak trough of low pressure that had developed about 1,000 mi (1,610 km) to the southwest of Honolulu, Hawaii. Over the next day as the system moved towards the northwest, showers and thunderstorms gradually developed along the trough, but were showing little to no signs of organisation. The system was subsequently classified as a tropical depression by the Japan Meteorological Agency during October 3, as it crossed the International Dateline and moved into the western Pacific Ocean.

Often presenting an exposed low-level circulation center (LLCC), the tropical depression drifted westward without further development for days owing to a marginal environment within the subsident region of a tropical upper tropospheric trough (TUTT) cell to the northwest, with moderate vertical wind shear. Late on October 7, the Joint Typhoon Warning Center (JTWC) eventually issued a Tropical Cyclone Formation Alert for the system, when the TUTT cell was beginning to move to the west-southwest, allowing convection to develop over the consolidating LLCC.

Shortly after the JTWC upgraded the system to a tropical depression early on October 8, the JMA upgraded it to a tropical storm and named it Songda at noon, about 500 km (310 mi) south of Minamitorishima. It was also upgraded to a tropical storm by the JTWC several hours later. The JMA upgraded Songda to a severe tropical storm late on October 9, when it was moving along the southwest periphery of the deep-layered subtropical ridge positioned to the northeast. Later, both of the JMA and JTWC reported that Songda had developed into a typhoon at 00:00 UTC on October 10. Turning northward, the typhoon rapidly intensified and formed a well-defined eye embedded in deep central convection, due to near radial outflow being limited on the southern portion, with a very strong poleward tap into the Westerlies, very low vertical wind shear, and sea surface temperature of 28 °C. However, the eye became cloud-filled and ragged early on the next day, when Songda began to accelerate northeastward along the poleward side of the subtropical ridge.

Typhoon Songda reintensified in the afternoon on October 11. Moving in-phase with such strong southwesterly vertical wind shear effectively reduced its overall impacts to the system, allowing a rapid intensification again. Therefore, Songda developed a larger and sharp eye with a very symmetric core structure. It reached its peak intensity about 1,050 km (650 mi) southeast of Tokyo, Japan at 18:00 UTC, with ten-minute maximum sustained winds at 185 km/h (115 mph) and the central pressure at 925 hPa (27.3 inHg) reported by the JMA, at an unusually high latitude (30.3ºN) for such powerful intensity. With one-minute maximum sustained winds at 240 km/h (150 mph) reported by the JTWC, equivalent to a Category 4 of the SSHWS, Songda was also an unusually northern super typhoon. Early on October 12, embedded deeper in the westerlies, the overall structure became more asymmetric with severe elongation and dispersion along the northern peripheries, leading to a weakening trend and prompting the JTWC issuing the final warning to Songda, although the eye remained well-defined until the afternoon.

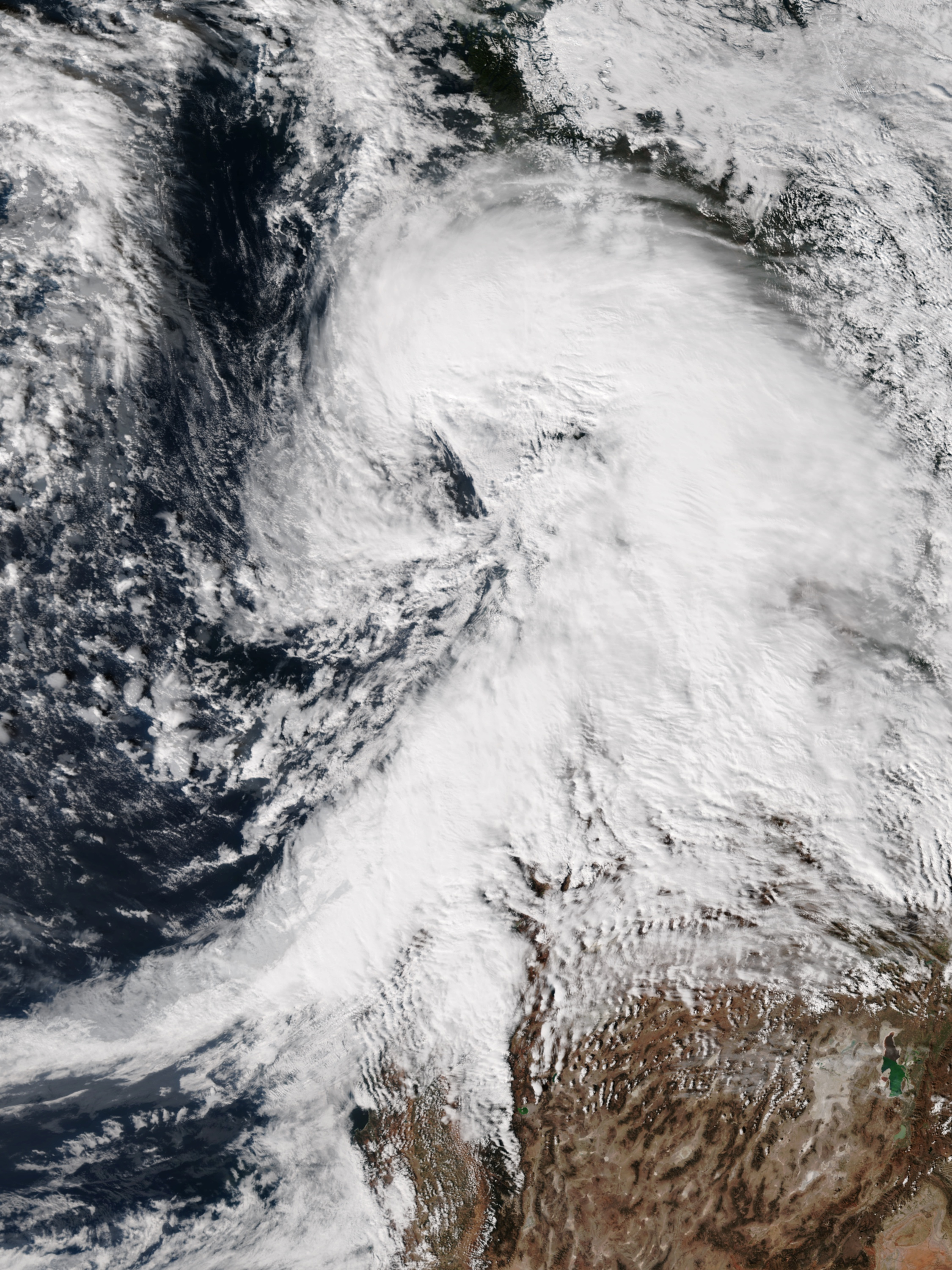
Songda as a hurricane-force low near Western Washington on October 15

Moving eastward at 95 km/h (59 mph), shortly after the JMA downgraded Songda to a severe tropical storm early on October 13, the system completed an extratropical transition south of the Aleutian Islands. After the system weakened into a gale-force low and crossed the 180th meridian again in the afternoon, the National Weather Service (NWS) office in Portland dubbed it the Ides of October storm on the next day. On October 15, the system turned northeastward and underwent an explosive intensification. The Ocean Prediction Center (OPC) reported that Post-Tropical Cyclone Songda developed into a hurricane-force low approximately 165 mi (266 km) west of Astoria, Oregon at 11:00 PDT (18:00 UTC), 6 hours before with the central pressure decreasing to 969 mbar (969 hPa; 28.6 inHg). Shortly after reaching hurricane-force, the extra-tropical cyclone weakened to storm-force and arrived at the coastline of Vancouver Island. The low continued to track northward and quickly became attached to a weakening stationary front, associated with a complex low-pressure system to the west, late on October 16; Songda's remnants were subsequently absorbed into the neighboring system.

== Preparations and impact ==
Typhoon Songda stayed over open ocean as a typhoon and had little to no impacts while in the Western Pacific Ocean.

The extratropical remnant of Songda was the last in a line of three strong low-pressure systems to affect the western coast of Canada and the United States from October 12 through October 16. The storm was predicted to be the strongest and potentially most devastating of the three. In preparation of the low pressure's arrival the cities of Victoria and Vancouver closed public parks to prevent injuries from falling trees. The City of Vancouver added 150 additional homeless spaces while the City of Victoria opened up 325 emergency shelters. A number of ferries to Vancouver Island were also cancelled during the evening of October 15 in advance of the storm. Utility providers had requested assistance from interior Canada to provide quick support in case of power outages. Environment Canada issued high wind and rain warnings for the west coast as winds of over 90 km/h (56 mph) were anticipated.

As the system neared the coast, wind gusts of 63 km/h (39 mph) were recorded at Vancouver International Airport, 69 km/h (43 mph) at Victoria Airport, and 59 km/h (37 mph) at Abbotsford Airport. The highest wind gust recorded during this event was 111 km/h (69 mph) at Race Rocks on the southern tip of Vancouver Island. The winds were weaker than predicted because of the compact nature of the storm.

The storm left a large number of trees knocked over. This rendered some roads impassable and resulted in structural damage to homes, cars, and power lines. At the height of the event as many as 34,000 residents were left without power.

== See also ==
- Weather of 2016
- Tropical cyclones in 2016
- Other storms of the same name
- Columbus Day storm of 1962
- Typhoon Nuri (2014)
