= 1982 Pacific typhoon season =

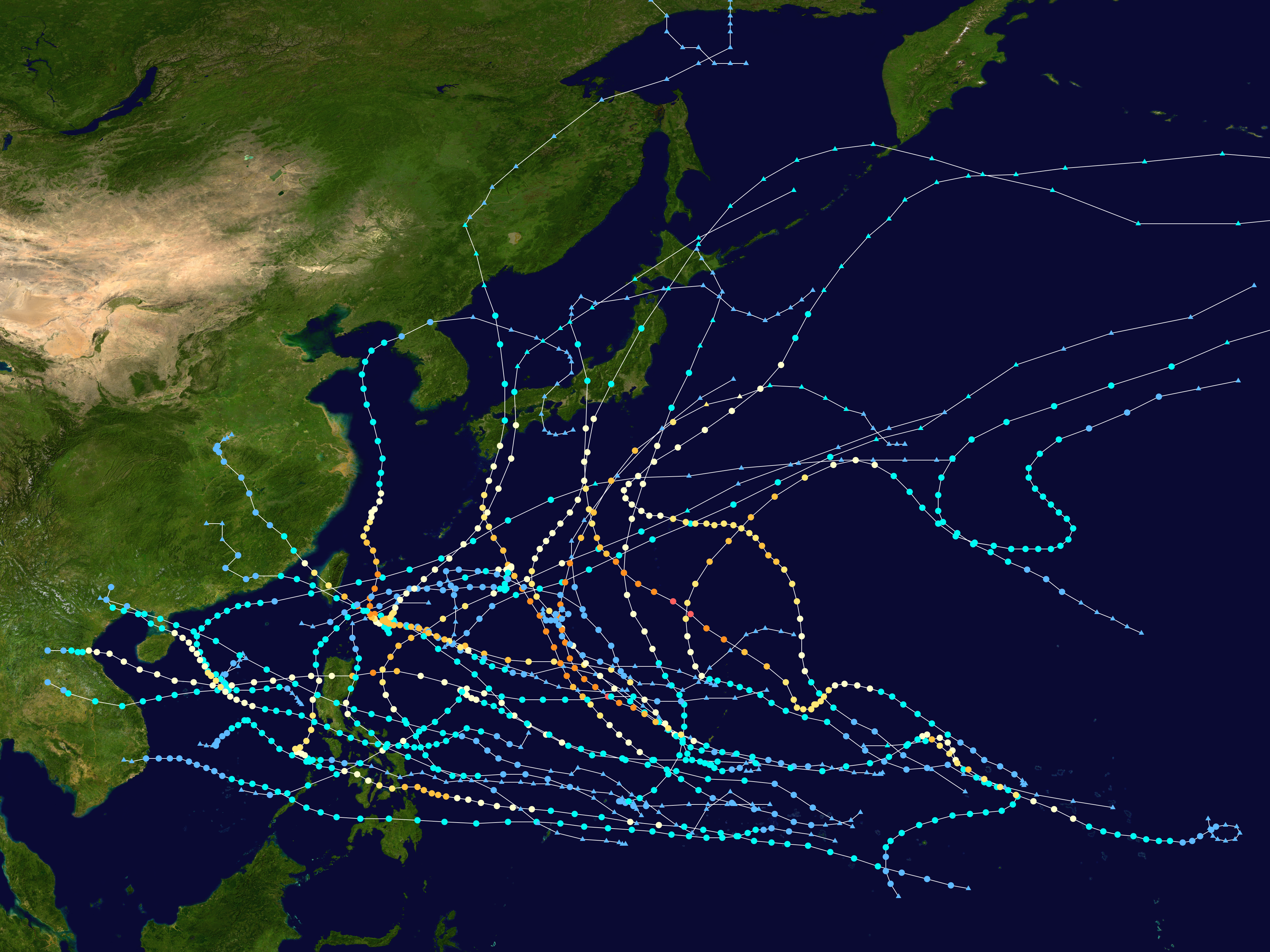
- Season summary map

Seasonal boundaries
- First system formed: January 19, 1982
- Last system dissipated: December 11, 1982

Strongest storm
- By maximum sustained winds: Bess
  - Maximum winds: 230 km/h (145 mph) (10-minute sustained)
  - Lowest pressure: 900 hPa (mbar)
- By central pressure: Mac
  - Maximum winds: 220 km/h (140 mph) (10-minute sustained)
  - Lowest pressure: 895 hPa (mbar)

Seasonal statistics
- Total depressions: 37
- Total storms: 25
- Typhoons: 19
- Very strong typhoons: 13
- Violent typhoons: 2
- Total fatalities: 805 total
- Total damage: > $3.61 billion (1982 USD)

Related articles
- 1982 Atlantic hurricane season; 1982 Pacific hurricane season; 1982 North Indian Ocean cyclone season

The 1982 Pacific typhoon season was an average season in terms of total tropical storms, though it featured a very high amount of typhoons. It ran year-round in 1982, but most tropical cyclones formed between May and November. These dates conventionally delimit the period of each year when most tropical cyclones form in the northwestern Pacific Ocean. A total of 37 tropical depressions formed this year, of which 25 became tropical storms and were assigned a name by the Joint Typhoon Warning Center. Additionally, tropical depressions that enter or form in the Philippine area of responsibility are assigned a name by the Philippine Atmospheric, Geophysical and Astronomical Services Administration or PAGASA. This can often result in the same storm having two names. This year, a total of 23 storms were named this way.

Of the 25 named storms, 19 storms reached typhoon intensity, of which only 2 reached super typhoon strength. During this season, the first tropical cyclone formed on March 16, and the last one dissipated on December 12. Two-thirds of the tropical cyclones formed between July and October. Typhoon Pamela was the longest-lived tropical cyclone of the season. Sixteen of the cyclones struck land during their life cycles, with eight moving through the Philippines. Tropical cyclones accounted for 35 percent of the 1982 rainfall across Hong Kong, their fifth wettest tropical cyclone contribution on record at the time. Nearly half of the deaths during the season were the result of Typhoon Nancy moving through the Philippines and Vietnam in October.

== Seasonal activity ==
A total of 37 tropical depressions formed this year in the Western Pacific, of which 26 became tropical storms. 19 storms reached typhoon intensity, of which 2 reached super typhoon strength. Three tropical cyclones formed in March (most active since 1967,) one in May, three in June, four in July, five in August, six in September, four in October, one in November, and one in December. Typhoon Pamela (Aning) was the longest-lived tropical cyclone of the season. Sixteen tropical cyclones made landfall, with eight moving through the Philippines, four striking China, three impacting Vietnam, and three crossing Japan. Tropical cyclones accounted for 35 percent of the 1982 rainfall across Hong Kong, their fifth wettest tropical cyclone contribution on record at the time.

Tropical Storm Mamie moved across the tropical western Pacific Ocean, striking the Philippines and Vietnam during mid to late March. Nelson formed soon after Mamie, becoming the first typhoon of the season which subsequently moved westward through the southern Philippines before dissipating shy of Vietnam in late March. Odessa formed well out to sea, wandering across the western Pacific before dissipating in early April, ending the most active March since 1967. Pat formed in mid May, approaching the Philippines before becoming an extratropical cyclone offshore Japan late in the month. Ruby wandered around the Marianas in late June, becoming an extratropical cyclone east of Japan.

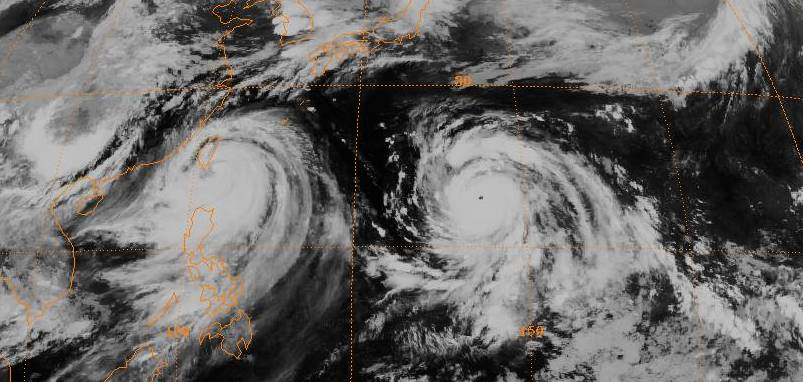
Satellite image of Typhoons Andy (left) and Bess (right) at 1500 UTC on July 28.

Tess became the first tropical cyclone of the season to form in the South China Sea during late June, weakening before reaching Taiwan in early July. The Japanese Meteorological Agency states that Val was a continuation of Tess, which moved east-northeast from Taiwan to the south of Japan in early July. Skip formed ahead of Tess, moving east-northeast well to the south of Japan in late June and early July. Winona moved west-northwest through the northern Philippines across Hainan Island into southern China before dissipating in mid July. Andy formed south of Guam, moving west-northwest across Taiwan into southern China in late July. Bess formed within the same monsoon trough which spawned Andy, moving generally northwest into Japan early in August.

Cecil formed northeast of the Philippines, moving northward offshore Taiwan and eastern China before moving ashore North Korea in mid-August. Dot formed east of Cecil, moving west-northwest into southern Taiwan and southeast China in mid-August. Ellis formed well east of the Philippines in mid-August, recurving northward into southern Japan late in the month. Faye wandered aimlessly between the central Philippines and Taiwan during late August and early September, steered partially by Gordon to its east-northeast. Gordon recurved offshore Japan during late August and early September.

Tropical Storm Hope moved through the South China Sea into Vietnam in early September. Irving moved across the central Philippines and Hainan Island before dissipating in southeast China in mid-September. Judy formed in the same monsoon trough which spawned Irving, recurving across central Japan during mid-September. Ken formed northeast of the Philippines in mid-September, recurving across southern Japan in late September. Tropical Storm Lola formed and recurved well east of Asia in mid-September. Tropical Depression 22 was a short lived system which moved northwestward east of the Philippines and south of Japan on September 21 and 22. Mac was the first super typhoon to form during the season, recurving southeast of Japan in early October.

Nancy was a straight-running typhoon which moved steadily westward across the northern Philippines south of Hainan Island into northern Vietnam. Tropical Depression 25 behaved similarly to Tropical Depression 22, moving northwest well east of the Philippines and south of Japan in mid October. Typhoon Owen meandered well to the southeast of Japan in mid and late October. Pamela moved generally westward across the central Philippines as a typhoon in early December. Roger was the last tropical cyclone of the season, and it moved northward along the northeast side of the Philippines in mid December before dissipating southeast of Taiwan.

== Systems ==
=== Severe Tropical Storm Mamie (Akang) ===
- Severe tropical storm (JMA)
- Tropical storm (SSHWS)
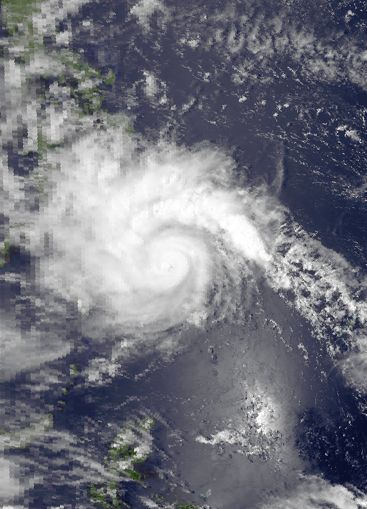
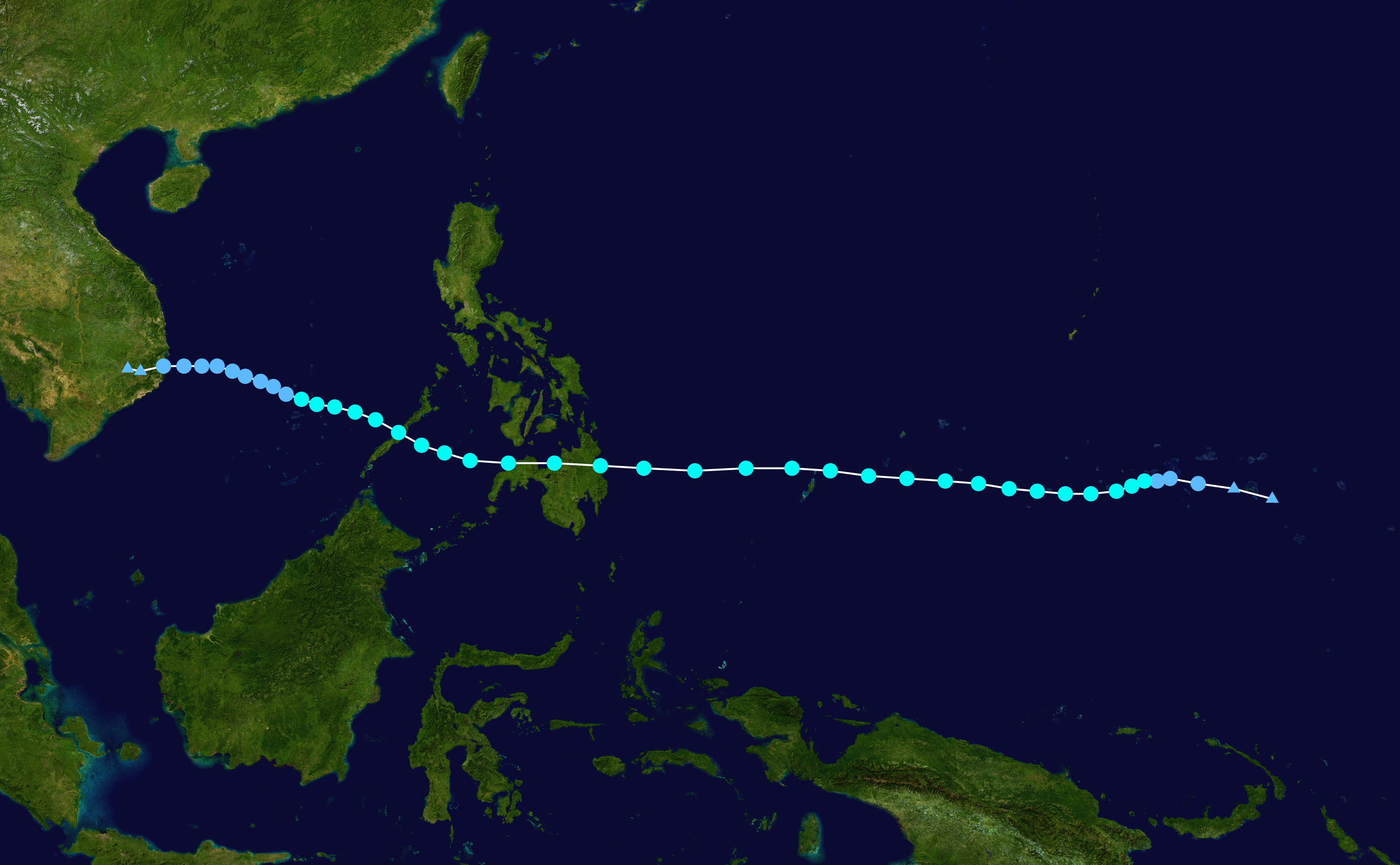
- Duration: March 15 – March 24
- Peak intensity: 95 km/h (60 mph) (10-min); 990 hPa (mbar)

The first system of the season was first noted in the Philippine Sea on March 7 just south of the equator. Over the next five days, the system drifted northward across the equator until a convective disturbance organized near Truk Atoll. On March 15, the JMA designated the system as a tropical depression, and a day later upgraded it to a tropical storm. (Note: The Japan Meteorological Agency is the official Regional Specialized Meteorological Center for the western Pacific Ocean.) The JTWC named it Tropical Storm Mamie based on reports from the hurricane hunters. Mamie moved westward for its duration due to a strong ridge to the north. (Note: Wind estimates from the JMA and most other basins throughout the world are sustained over 10 minutes, while estimates from the United States-based Joint Typhoon Warning Center are sustained over 1 minute. 10 minute winds are about 1.14 times the amount of 1 minute winds.) On March 19, the storm strengthened and briefly developed an eyewall just before moving ashore the eastern Philippines in Mindanao. The JMA and JTWC estimated peak winds of 95 and 115 km/h (60 and 70 mph) respectively. Mamie weakened over land and emerged into the South China Sea on March 21. Mamie failed to re-intensify as it turned northwest and back to the west. Midday on March 24, Mamie made landfall in Nha Trang and subsequently weakened rapidly inland over mountainous terrain. The JMA stopped tracking its remnants that evening, with the JTWC following suit at 00:00 UTC on March 25.

The Philippine province of Surigao del Sur bore the brunt of the tropical storm, and 117 people died throughout the country, while eight others were injured. Floods killed 13 people in Bukidnon, In Surigao, 28 people were killed and 41 were reported missing, including 14 aboard a speedboat offshore Bislig. Most of the deaths were due to falling debris. Throughout the archipelago, eight people were injured by the tropical storm. Nationwide, the cyclone damaged 11,147 homes and demolished 1,880 others, and leaving 15,654 people displaced from their home, most of whom ended up in evacuation centers. Power lines were knocked down, which left many communities isolated. Property damage totaled $100 million 1982 USD, including $40 million from private and government buildings.

=== Typhoon Nelson (Bising) ===
- Very strong typhoon (JMA)
- Category 3 typhoon (SSHWS)
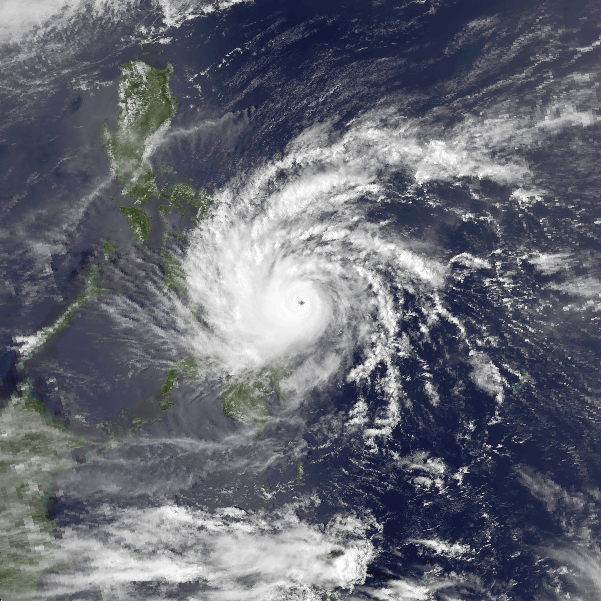
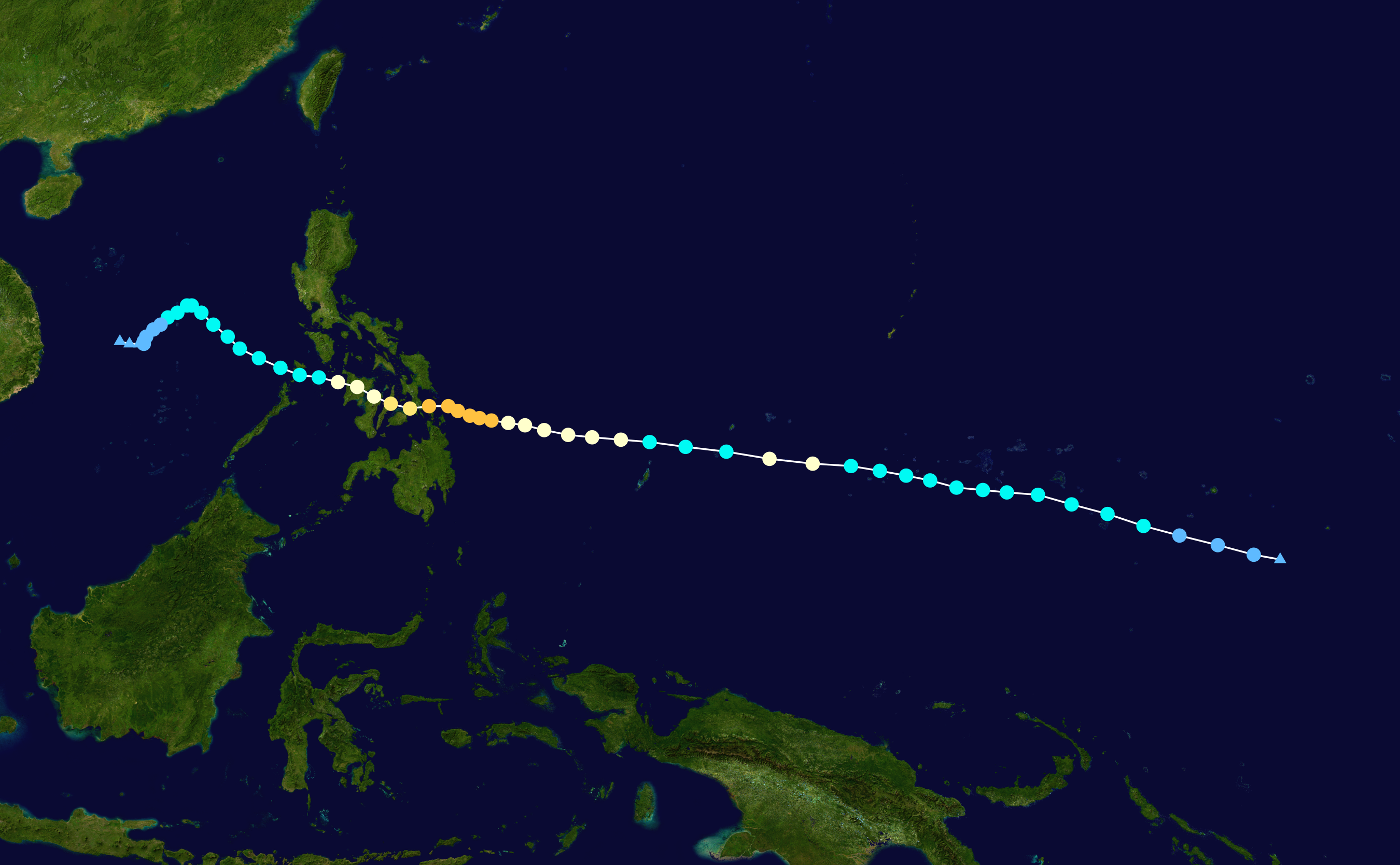
- Duration: March 18 – March 31
- Peak intensity: 185 km/h (115 mph) (10-min); 935 hPa (mbar)

This storm was the second of three early season, low latitude systems to form to the southeast of Guam. Nelson intensified rapidly from a tropical disturbance into a tropical storm. This was due to very strong divergence aloft. Strong low level easterlies and rapid westward movement led to slower development thereafter. After March 22, forward motion began to slow and intensification resumed. Maximum intensity was reached on March 25. On March 27, Nelson moved through the south-central Philippines and rapidly weakened. Fifty-six perished across the Philippines from this typhoon.

Slight intensification resumed as the center emerged into the South China Sea. By March 30, upper level wind shear led to significant weakening, with the low level center becoming exposed and eventually dissipating on April 1 about 445 kilometres (277 mi) east of Nha Trang, Vietnam.

=== Typhoon Odessa ===
- Typhoon (JMA)
- Category 1 typhoon (SSHWS)
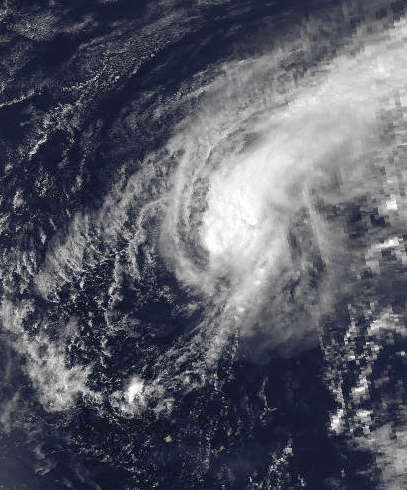
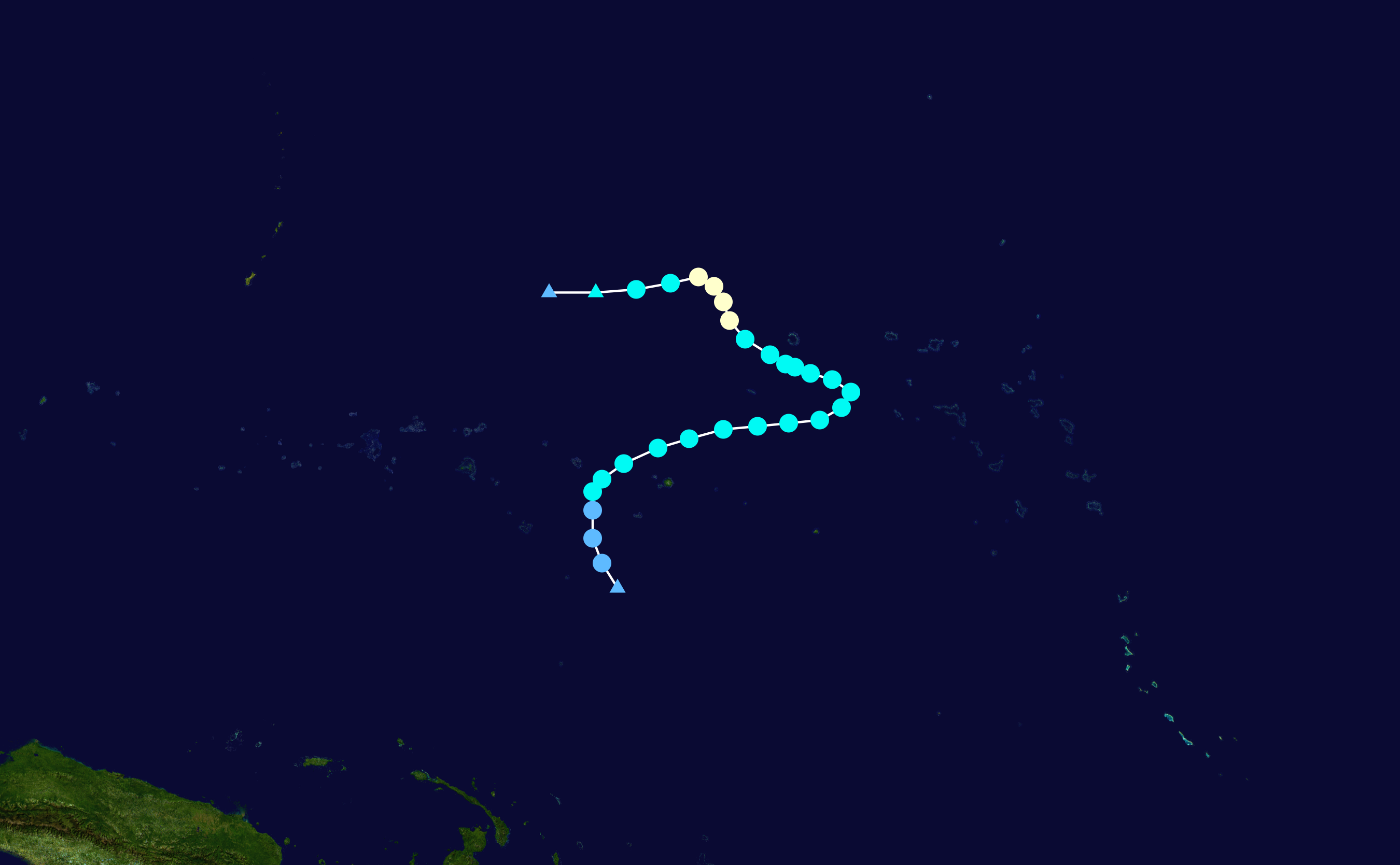
- Duration: March 29 – April 4
- Peak intensity: 140 km/h (85 mph) (10-min); 965 hPa (mbar)

An area of disorganized thunderstorms was noted near 2N 159E on March 26. Moving northwest due to significant cyclogenesis offshore Japan, a circulation center developed within this convective cluster over the next few days. By the afternoon of March 29, it had matured into a tropical storm. A mid-level trough extended southwest towards the cyclone. Combined with strong ridging building in north to northwest of the storm, Odessa ceased moving northwest and turned east at around 10 knots (19 km/h) during March 30 and March 31. As the mid-level trough continued moving east, Odessa turned back to the north, and eventually west-northwest, as ridging built in north of the cyclone. After the change in course to west, intensification resumed, and the system reached typhoon strength in the afternoon of April 2. As Odessa peaked in strength a weakness in the subtropical ridge lured its convection northeast, shearing the thunderstorms away from the center. Rapid weakening ensued, and the cyclone dissipated on the afternoon of April 4.

The occurrence of this cyclone ended the most active March for tropical cyclone formation in the northwest Pacific Ocean since 1967. Odessa was unique from a climatological standpoint, moving east and west in an area normally known for northward moving tropical cyclones in March.

=== Typhoon Pat (Klaring) ===
- Very strong typhoon (JMA)
- Category 3 typhoon (SSHWS)
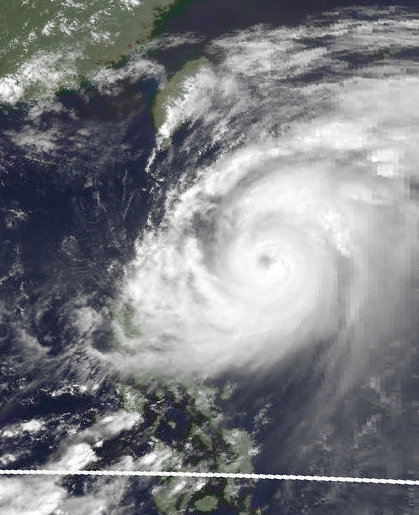
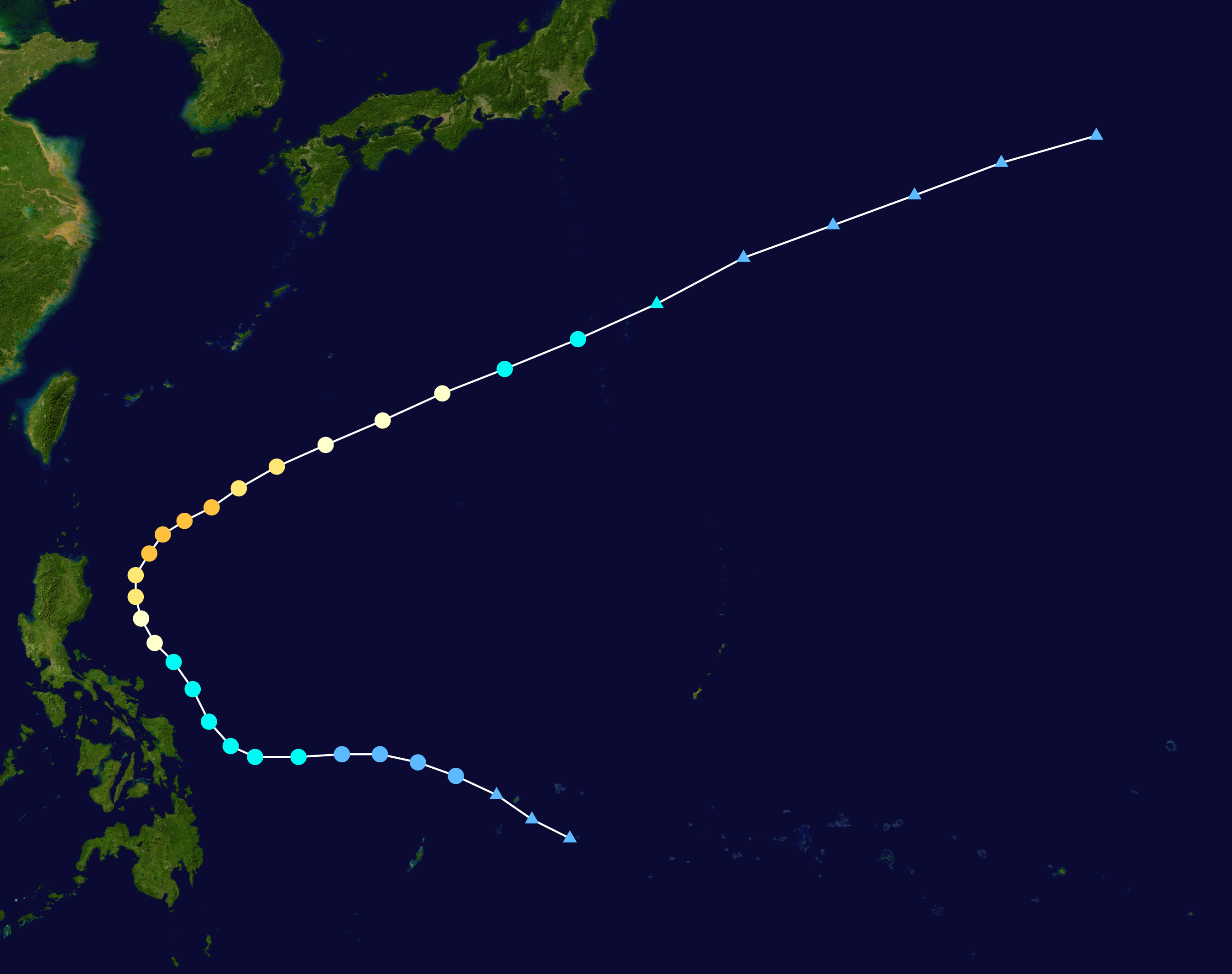
- Duration: May 16 – May 24
- Peak intensity: 165 km/h (105 mph) (10-min); 945 hPa (mbar)

Typhoon Pat became the lone tropical cyclone in the western Pacific basin during the two-month interval between Odessa's dissipation and the formation of Ruby. The disturbance which led to Pat's formation developed southwest of Guam on May 14. By May 17 the system had organized sufficiently to become a tropical depression. Moving westward until the afternoon of May 18, Pat abruptly changed course to the north through a break in the subtropical ridge parallel and close to the Philippines. Rapid intensification ensued, with Pat reaching its maximum intensity late on May 21. As the cyclone turned to the northeast, vertical wind shear began to weaken the cyclone. Its wind field broadened as it began extratropical transition. By midday on May 23, Pat had evolved into an extratropical cyclone along a frontal boundary with cool, dry air wrapping into its center. The cyclone became absorbed by a larger system near Japan on May 24.

=== Typhoon Ruby ===
- Typhoon (JMA)
- Category 1 typhoon (SSHWS)
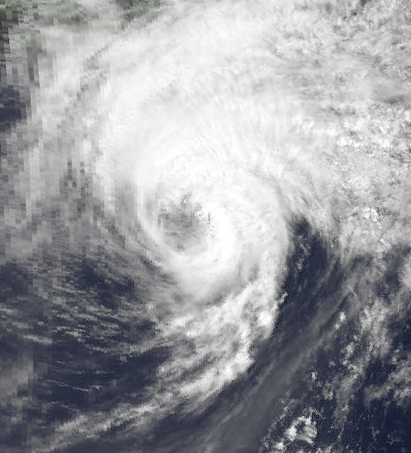
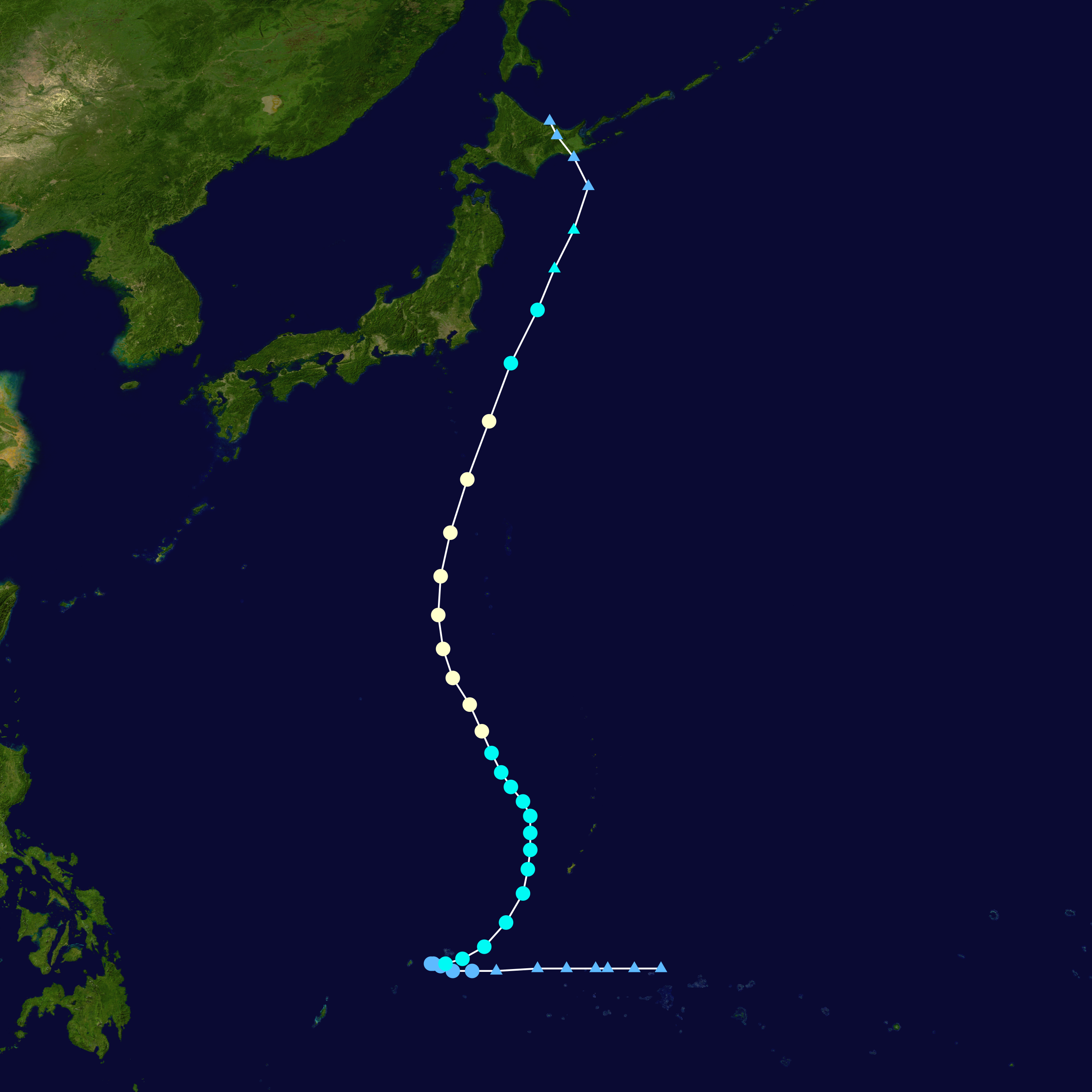
- Duration: June 20 – June 27
- Peak intensity: 130 km/h (80 mph) (10-min); 975 hPa (mbar)

A blob of thunderstorms was noticed about 600 kilometres (370 mi) southeast of Guam on June 18. It tracked westward, without significant development until June 20 while passing south of Ulithi Atoll. Steering currents collapsed, and the system drifted between Ulithi and Yap for the next couple of days. By the morning of June 21, the system had strengthened into a tropical storm. The system drifted north to northwest, then northeast towards Guam. Ruby waited to detach from the monsoon trough before further strengthening was realized on June 23. Steady intensification ensued, and the cyclone accelerated northward, becoming a typhoon on the afternoon of June 24. Ruby became an extratropical cyclone on June 27, occluding and becoming nearly stationary east of Hokkaidō for several days. Two vessels with a collective crew of 42 people became stranded off the coast of Honshu during the typhoon. The 19 crew of the No. 10 Soichi-Maru were rescued while the 23 members on the No. 8 Takojima-Maru remained missing.

Heavy rains fell near the path of this cyclone. Yap Island received 594.4 millimetres (23.40 in) of rainfall. Koror, within Palau, recorded 277 millimetres (10.9 in) of rain. Anderson Air Force Base on Guam measured 184.2 millimetres (7.25 in) of rain.

=== Tropical Storm Tess–Val (Deling) ===
- Tropical storm (JMA)
- Tropical storm (SSHWS)
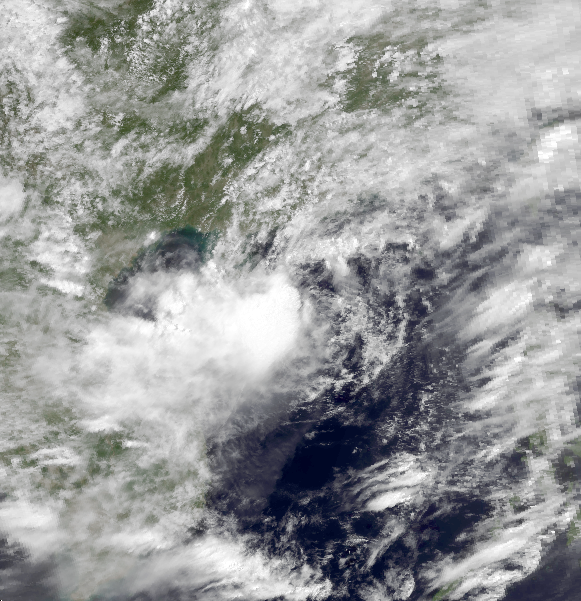
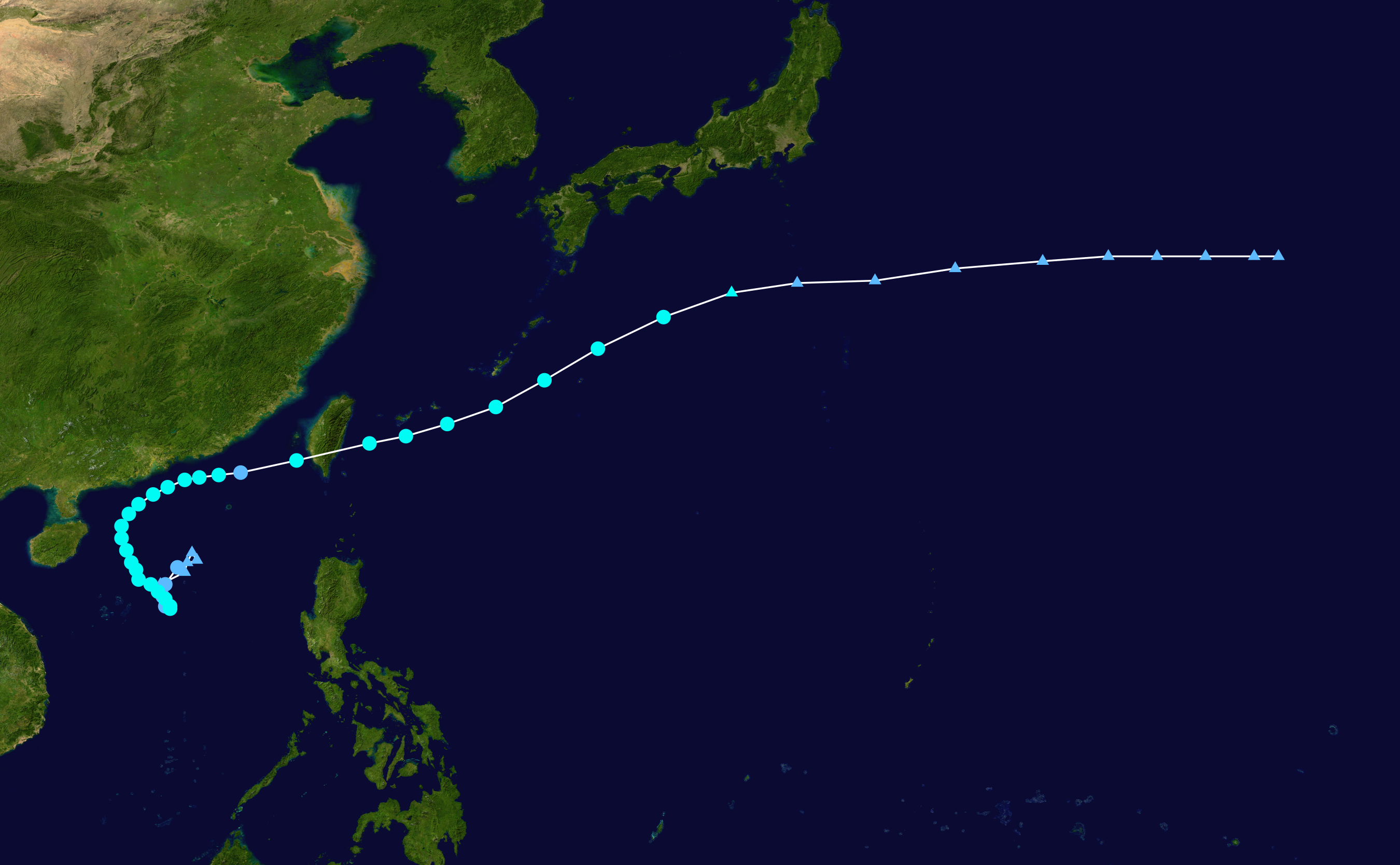
- Duration: June 25 – July 3
- Peak intensity: 85 km/h (50 mph) (10-min); 985 hPa (mbar)

The initial disturbance formed in the South China Sea in late June as a monsoon depression. A weak low-level circulation formed on June 27, but convection remained far from the center. By June 29, convection had become nearer to the center and it qualified as a tropical depression. No additional development was seen through June 30 as the system moved northward. The cyclone turned east-northeast, paralleling the coast of China. When tropical storm force winds were observed in Hong Kong, the cyclone was upgraded to a tropical storm late on June 30. Winds gusted to 53 knots (98 km/h) at Tate's Cairn, and 279.2 millimetres (10.99 in) of rain fell from the cyclone. Quickly weakening back to a tropical depression early on July 1, Tess dissipated as it approached the Formosa Strait.

The Japanese Meteorological Agency states that Val was a continuation of Tess, which moved east-northeast from Taiwan to the south of Japan in early July. Its circulation center moved along a frontal-like band east of Taiwan on July 1. Isolated convection was seen near the low pressure center at the time. When deeper convection formed on July 3, Val was deemed to become a tropical storm. In the Joint Typhoon Warning Center write-up, it was considered a subtropical cyclone after the fact. The cyclone accelerated northeast, and by July 4 whatever central convection it once had was gone and it was considered an extratropical cyclone late that morning.

=== Tropical Storm Skip ===
- Tropical storm (JMA)
- Tropical storm (SSHWS)
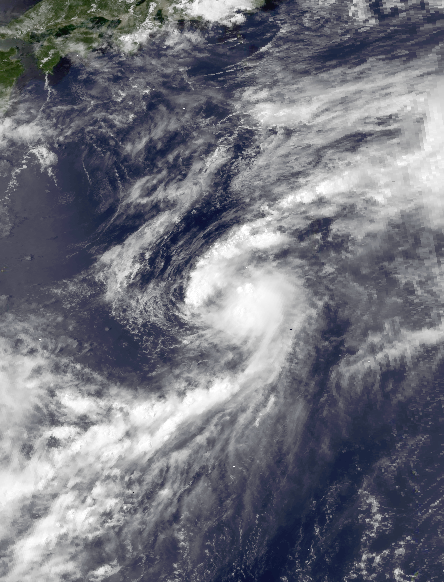
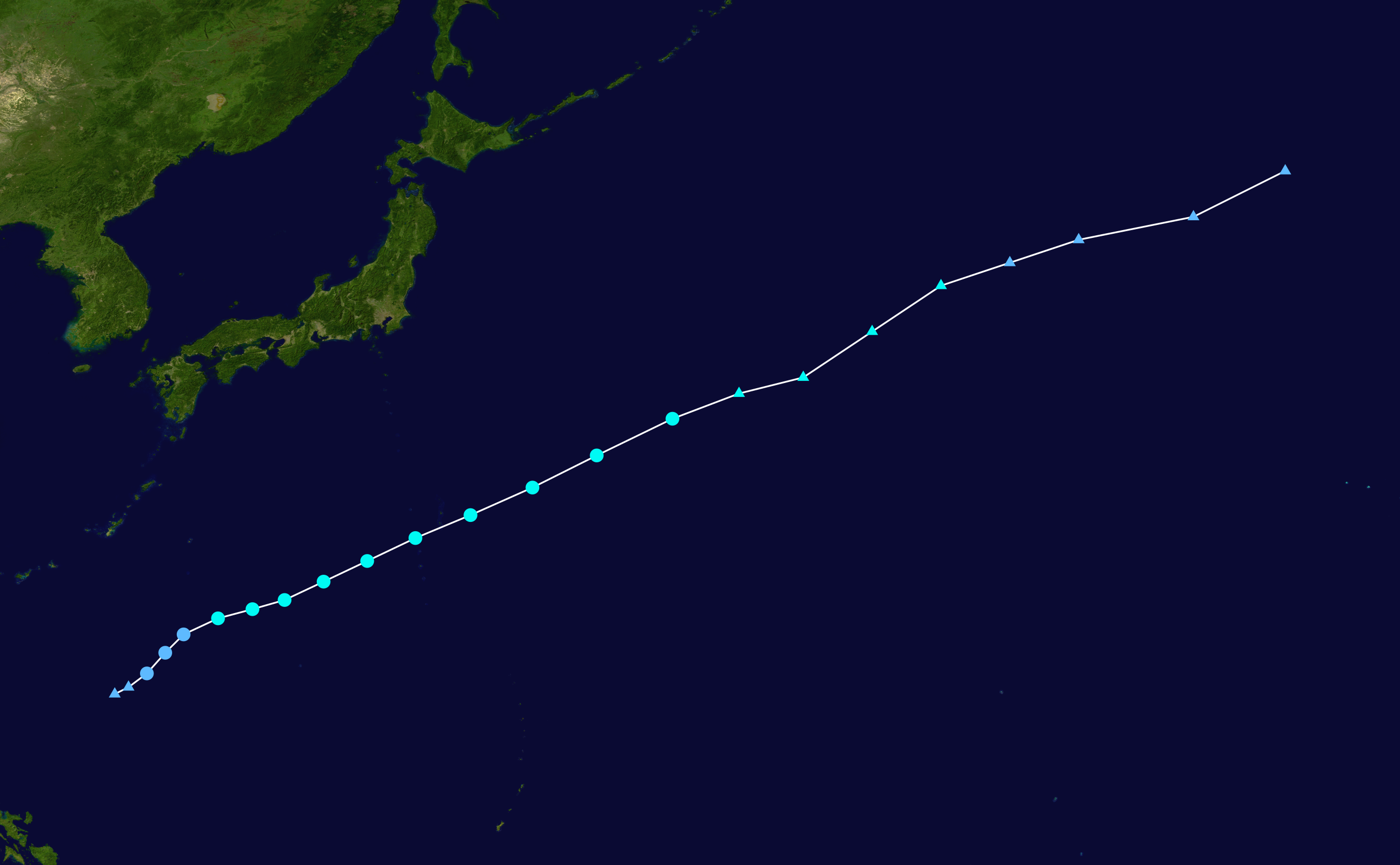
- Duration: June 29 – July 1
- Peak intensity: 85 km/h (50 mph) (10-min); 992 hPa (mbar)

Skip formed from a tropical disturbance near 20N 124E on June 26. A sharp trough connected Ruby with Skip at this time, which was undergoing frontogenesis as Ruby became extratropical. By late morning on June 30, Skip was of tropical storm strength accelerating up the frontal boundary to its northeast with limited convection near its center, and was considered by the Joint Typhoon Warning center as a subtropical cyclone in its annual report. By July 2, what limited convection was near the center of Skip disappeared, and it became an extratropical cyclone.

=== Severe Tropical Storm Winona (Emang) ===
- Severe tropical storm (JMA)
- Tropical storm (SSHWS)
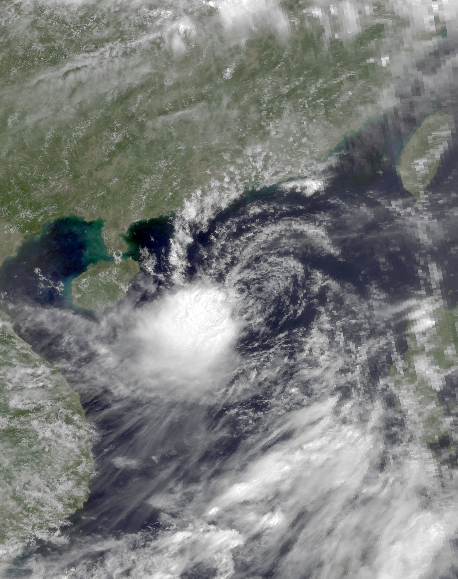
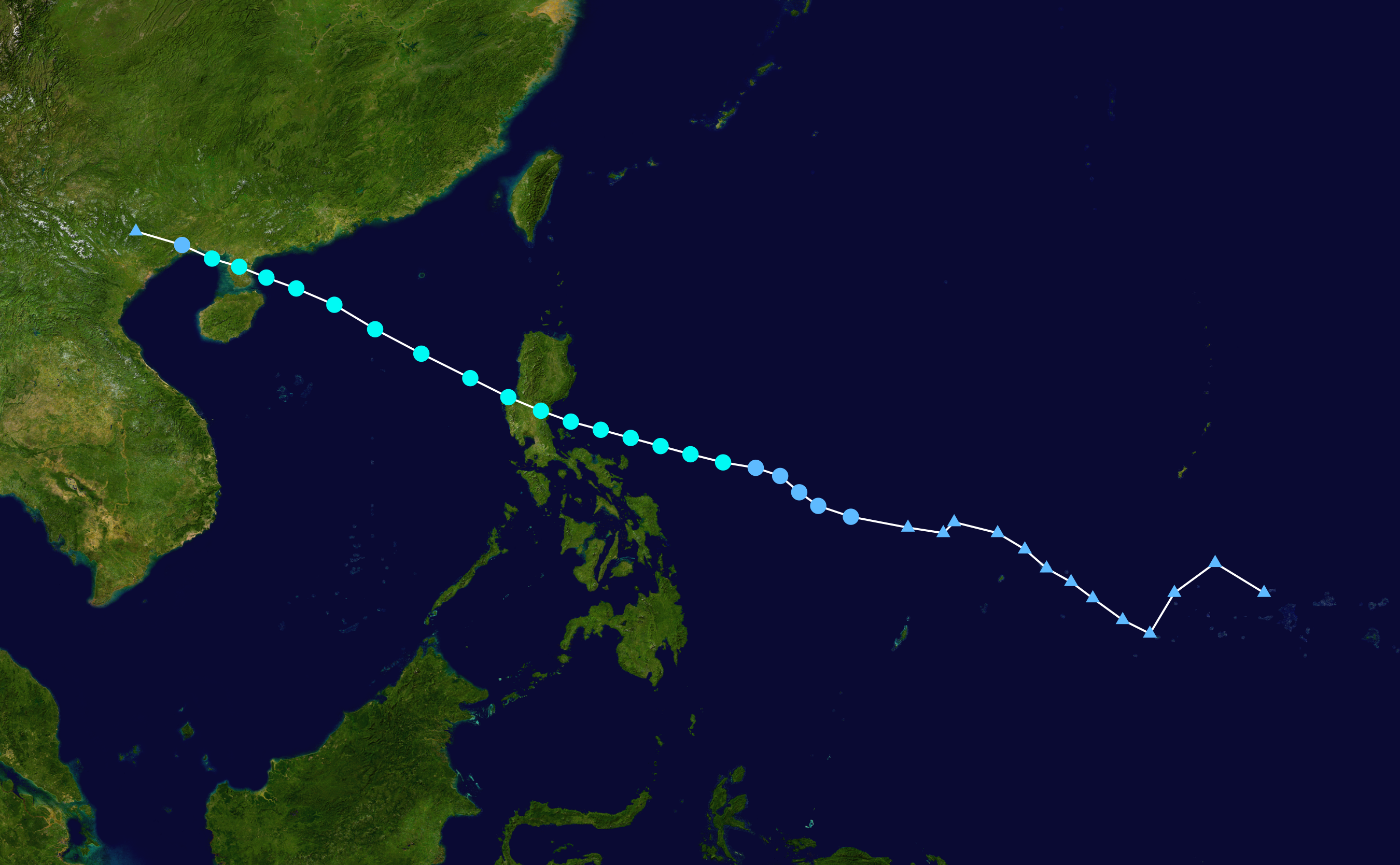
- Duration: July 10 – July 17
- Peak intensity: 95 km/h (60 mph) (10-min); 985 hPa (mbar)

Moderate to strong northeasterly vertical wind shear hampered the development of this tropical cyclone throughout its life cycle. Between July 10 and July 12, its predecessor disturbance marched westward with little development. Observations from Yap late on July 12 verified the existence of a developing low-level center, and it was upgraded to a tropical depression at this time. Moving west-northwest along the southern periphery of the subtropical ridge, Winona made landfall on Luzon during the afternoon of July 15. Rainfall at Clark Air Force Base totaled 81.5 millimetres (3.21 in). Damage to Clark Air Force Base totalled US$250,000 (1982 dollars). Two died and 5000 were left homeless in the Philippines were left homeless by the ensuing flood. Reintensifying in the South China Sea, the cyclone reached its peak intensity on the afternoon of July 16. Thereafter, wind shear took its toll and the cyclone began to weaken. The cyclone revealed an exposed low-level center on July 17, and the system dissipated before reaching the China/Vietnam coast on July 18. Winds gusted to 50 knots (93 km/h) at Tate's Cairn.

=== Tropical Depression Gading ===
- Tropical depression (JMA)
- Duration: July 17 – July 19
- Peak intensity: <55 km/h (35 mph) (10-min); 1006 hPa (mbar)

On July 17, the JMA began to track a weak tropical depression over in the Philippine Sea, and was last noted the next day while tracking westward. The PAGASA tracked the system until July 19 when it was last noted affected the Philippine Archipelago of Luzon.

=== Tropical Depression Heling ===
- Tropical depression (PAGASA)
- Duration: July 21 – July 23
- Peak intensity: 55 km/h (35 mph) (10-min); 1004 hPa (mbar)

The PAGASA had tracked Tropical Depression Heling from July 21 through to July 23, located in the Philippine Sea. The JMA only classified the system as a low-pressure area.

=== Typhoon Andy (Iliang) ===
- Very strong typhoon (JMA)
- Category 4 typhoon (SSHWS)
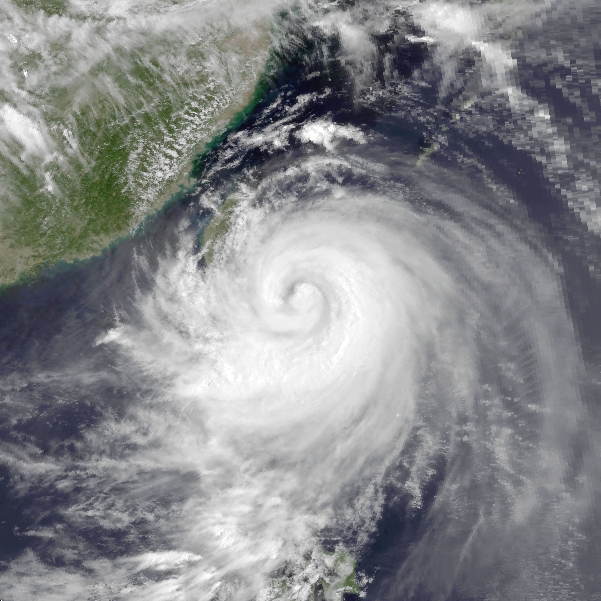
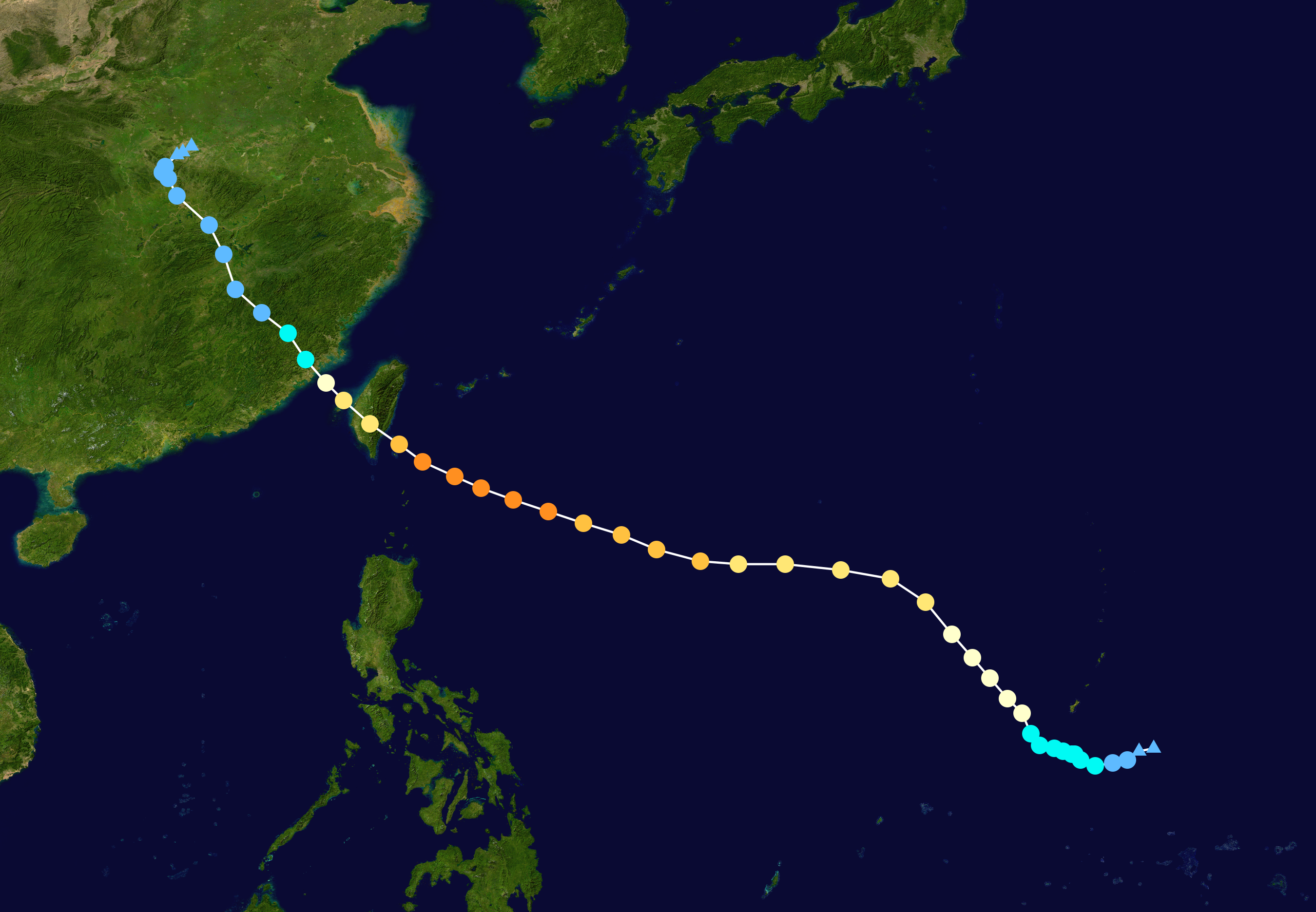
- Duration: July 21 – July 31
- Peak intensity: 185 km/h (115 mph) (10-min); 930 hPa (mbar)

The system formed on the northern edge of the monsoon trough south of Guam. Prior to its formation, low-level westerlies were firmly in place south of the 10th parallel eastward to the International Date Line. On July 20, the monsoon trough segmented, with the middle segment becoming Andy (Bess formed from the eastern segment). On July 22, the area south of Guam showed increasing thunderstorm activity and organization. That morning, it became a tropical storm. Andy's center briefly became exposed on July 23 before drifting back under the thunderstorm activity. After looping south of Guam, the cyclone moved northwest and strengthened. Andy turned westward near the 18th parallel on July 25 as the ridge to its northeast strengthened. The system became a strong typhoon for a prolonged period on July 28 and July 29 before striking southern Taiwan.

Heavy rains fell over Hong Kong, where 205.3 millimetres (8.08 in) fell at Tate's Cairn. A deluge fell across eastern Taiwan, where flood-related damage was concentrated. Continuing westward through the Formosa Strait, the storm made its final landfall and dissipated in southeast China on July 30. Andy led to 13 deaths across Taiwan.

=== Typhoon Bess ===
- Violent typhoon (JMA)
- Category 5 super typhoon (SSHWS)
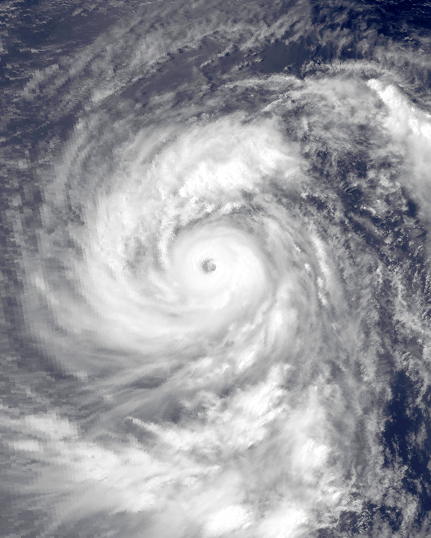
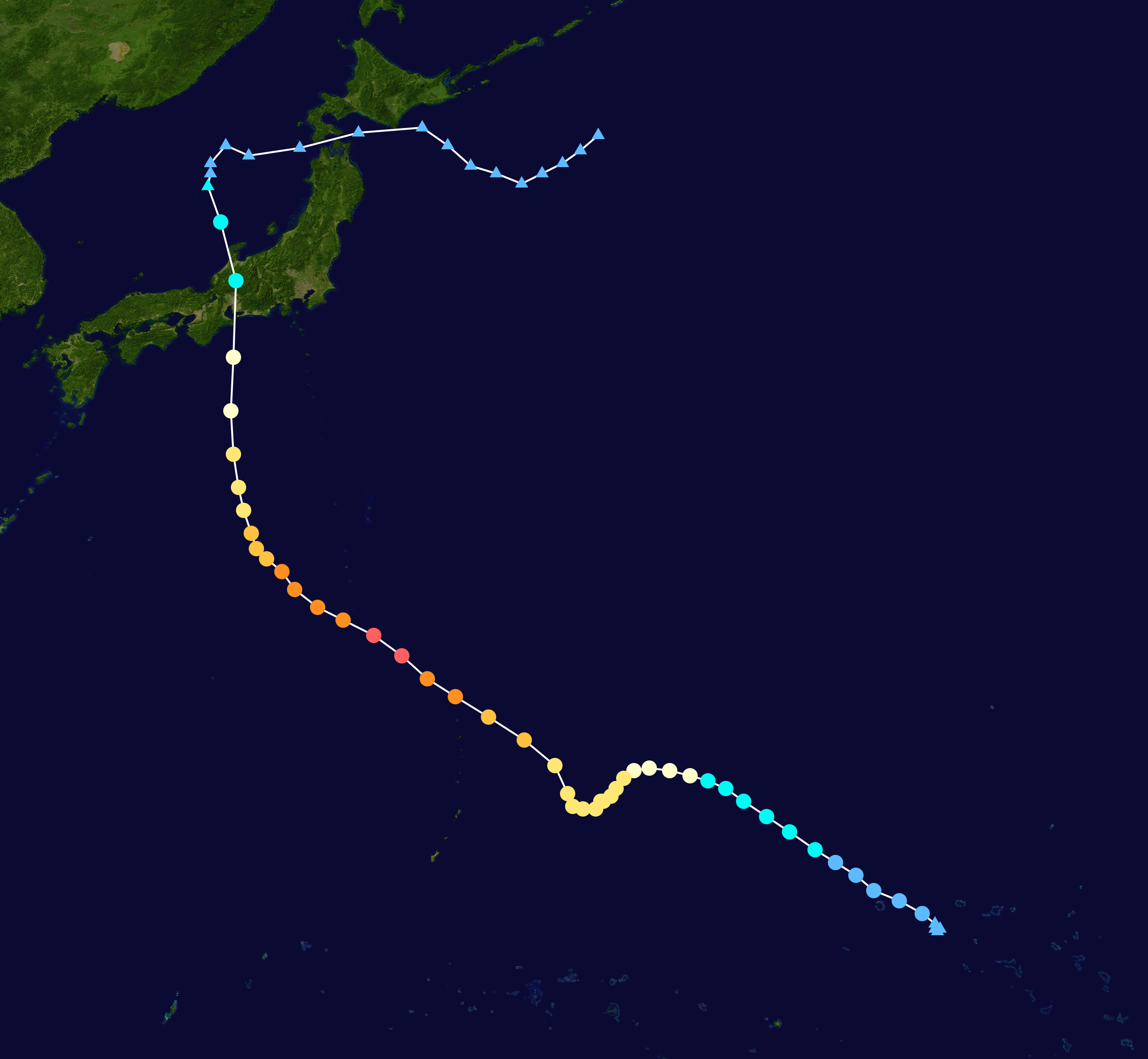
- Duration: July 21 – August 3
- Peak intensity: 230 km/h (145 mph) (10-min); 900 hPa (mbar)

The monsoon trough spawned a tropical depression near Kwajalein on July 22. It headed northwestward, becoming a tropical storm on July 23 and a typhoon on July 24. A shortwave trough forced Bess southwestward where it remained a 90 knots (170 km/h) typhoon. It looped and stalled until another shortwave trough brought the typhoon to the northwest. Bess rapidly intensified to a 140 knots (260 km/h) super typhoon, and weakened steadily as it turned more northward. Bess crossed the Japanese coast on August 1 as a minimal typhoon, and was absorbed by a low pressure center in the Sea of Japan on August 2. Bess caused torrential mudslides in Japan, causing extensive damage and 95 casualties. The name Bess was retired after this season.

=== Typhoon Cecil (Loleng) ===
- Very strong typhoon (JMA)
- Category 4 super typhoon (SSHWS)
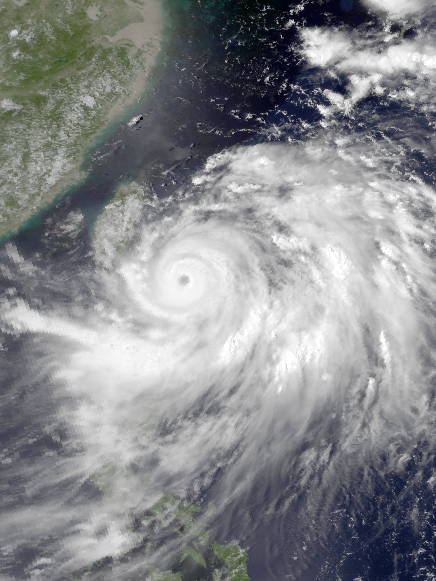
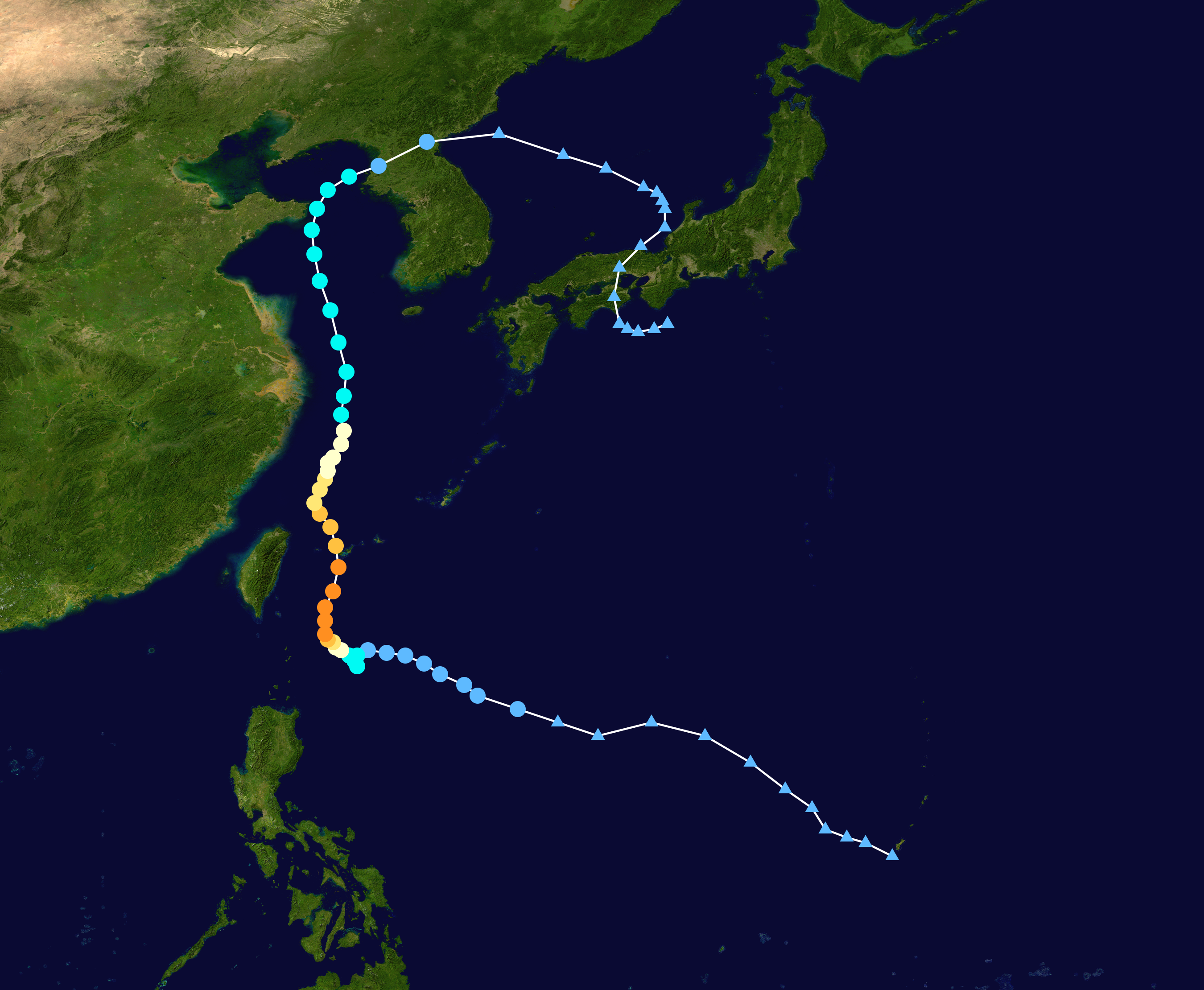
- Duration: August 4 – August 14
- Peak intensity: 155 km/h (100 mph) (10-min); 920 hPa (mbar)

A low-level circulation north of Chuuk organized into a tropical depression on August 4. After moving quickly westward, the depression stalled on August 5 and August 6, allowing it to strengthen into a tropical storm and mature into a typhoon on August 7. The typhoon turned northward, rapidly intensifying to maximum sustained winds of 130 knots (240 km/h) on August 8 while east of Taiwan. Cooler water temperatures and vertical wind shear weakened Cecil as it continued northward, and as a 35 knots (65 km/h) tropical storm, it hit North Korea on August 14.

The outer rainbands of the typhoon lashed Taiwan with heavy rains, where 9.2 in (230 mm) fell in a 32-hour time span. A landslide killed 18 people in the Wugu District, where 4 people were rendered missing and 2,800 families were stranded. Flash flooding claimed one life and resulted in four others missing in Taoyuan. Overall, 19 people perished in the country. After passing Taiwan, rough seas near the Ryukyu Islands left the 24,655 t (27,177 short tons) World Cosmos and 3,654 t (4,028 short tons) Marvie in distress. Along mainland Japan, three people were killed and two others were wounded in Miyazaki Prefecture and Ōita Prefecture. In Hinokage, 2,100 homes lost electricity and 500 residents were evacuated from their home.

Across South Korea, the storm dumped 410 mm (16 in) of rain in some places, including 550 mm (22 in) in Sancheong County. These rains resulted in landslides in 10 provinces. Nationwide, 35 people were killed, 28 were missing, and 28 were hurt. Nearly 1,300 houses were flooded, leaving 6,200 people homeless. Sancheong County along with the city of Changwon were the hardest hit by the storm, where three mudslides killed nine people and left six missing. In all, damage in the country amounted to US$30 million.

=== Typhoon Dot (Miding) ===
- Typhoon (JMA)
- Category 1 typhoon (SSHWS)
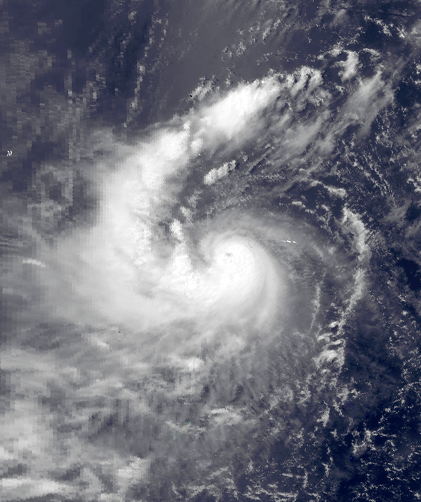
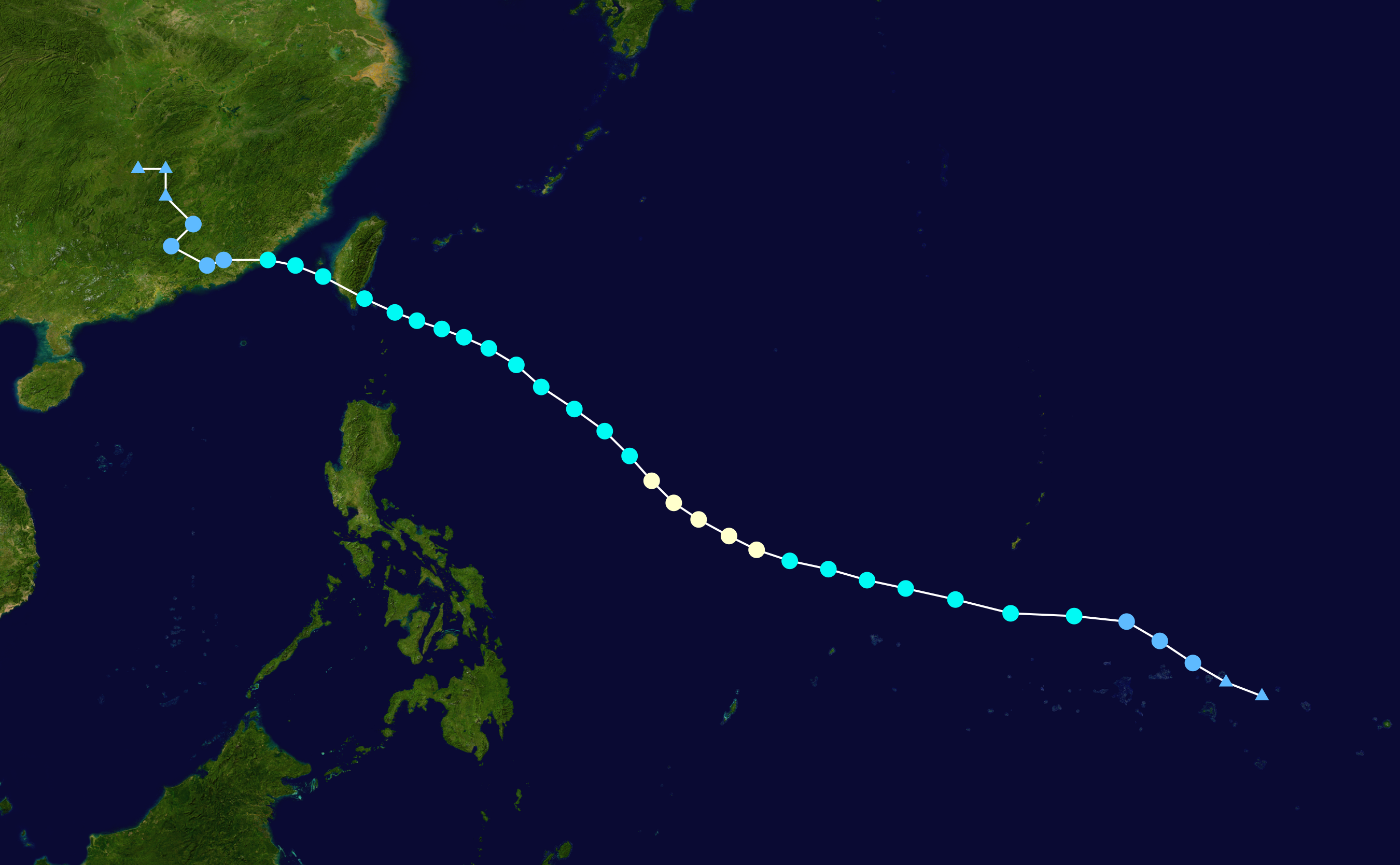
- Duration: August 5 – August 18
- Peak intensity: 150 km/h (90 mph) (10-min); 960 hPa (mbar)

A weak circulation formed near Kwajalein on August 5. Over the next couple days, the low moved northwest. Slowly developing, it became a tropical depression on the morning of August 9, and a tropical storm by evening. Becoming a typhoon on August 11, Dot moved westward under the base of the subtropical ridge. DOt peaked as an extremely strong category 1 typhoon, with and unusual low pressure of 960. By August 12, Cecil's outflow began to impact Dot, and weakening ensued, sending Dot back to the tropical storm stage. As Cecil's influence began to lessen on August 13, Dot stopped weakening. As a tropical storm, Dot rapidly passed over Taiwan on August 15, rapidly weakening over the mountainous island. As a weak tropical storm, Dot dissipated after making landfall in eastern China. As of 2005, Dot is the eighth wettest known typhoon for Hong Kong. It dropped 491.7 millimetres (19.36 in) of rainfall upon the region.

=== Typhoon Ellis (Oyang) ===
- Very strong typhoon (JMA)
- Category 4 typhoon (SSHWS)
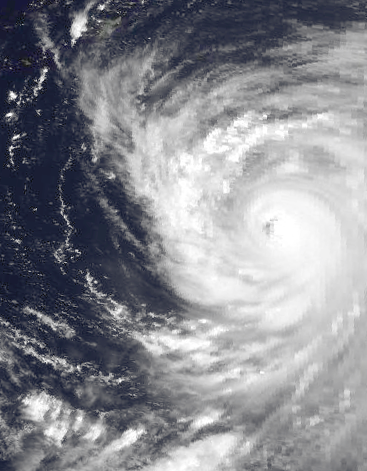
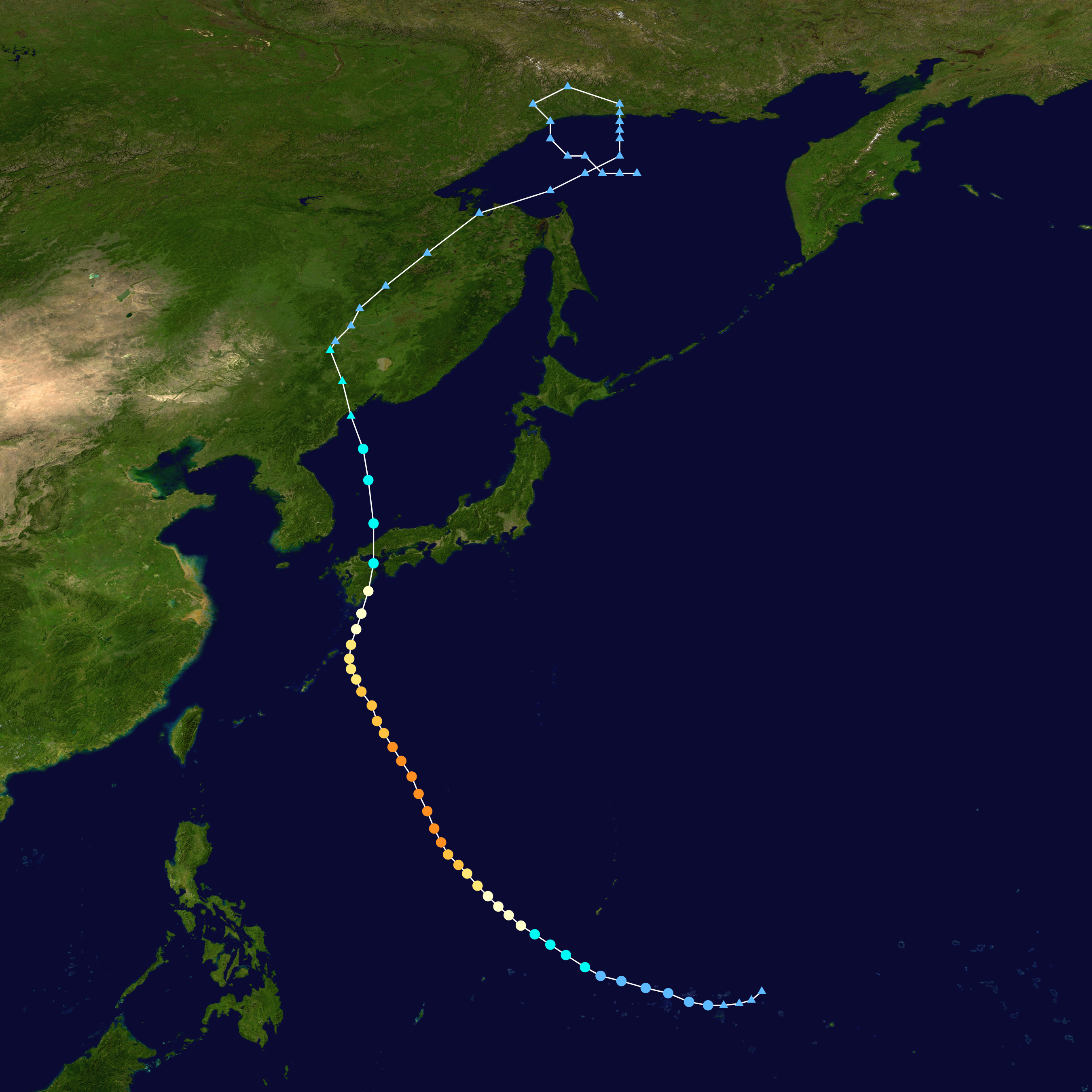
- Duration: August 18 – August 27
- Peak intensity: 185 km/h (115 mph) (10-min); 915 hPa (mbar)

A disturbance appeared in the monsoon trough south of Ponape on August 15. Modest development ensued as it moved west-northwest, and the system was classified as a tropical depression on the morning of August 19, and a tropical storm that night. Turning to the northwest, Ellis became a typhoon on the morning of August 21, and ultimately a major typhoon on August 22. A mid-level trough moving into the Yellow Sea continued Ellis' recurvature. Soon after peaking as a lower-end category 4 cyclone, Ellis soon began to weaken in response to an eyewall replacement cycle that began to happen in Ellis. Moving east of Okinawa on August 25, the cyclone headed northward towards Japan, where it encountered colder waters, causing the system to weaken even further as Ellis struck Japan. Moving by Kyūshū, Shikoku, and Honshū, the cyclone degenerated into a tropical storm. Heavy rains up to 711 millimetres (28.0 in) inundated southwest Japan, bringing life to a standstill for the region. Five perished across Japan. Moving into the Sea of Japan on August 27, Ellis evolved into an extratropical cyclone which turned back to the northwest, ending up about 220 kilometres (140 mi) west of Vladivostok.The extratropical cyclone then churned in the open area near Russia and Alaska, bringing some rains.

Prior to the approach of the typhoon, many residents of Nagasaki Prefecture evacuated their homes. Virtually all domestic flights to and from the islands of Kyushu and Shikoku were canceled, resulting in approximately 5,000 stranded customers. In Shikoku, 14,000 houses lost power. One person was killed in Kagoshima Prefecture and Miyazaki Prefecture each. Overall, 20 homes were destroyed, 985 houses were flooded, 6 bridges were washed away, and landslides occurred in 137 places, 19 of which occurred in Miyazaki, Kagoshima, and Ōita Prefectures, prompting 4,604 people to flee their homes in Miyazaki. Nationwide, five people were killed, two were wounded, and twenty-seven were wounded. Across South Korea, three people were killed and five were missing. Over 1,000 houses received damage, leaving more than 5,000 people homeless. Crops were flooded while roads and communication lines were cut across the eastern portion of the country. Total damage in Kochi Prefecture was ¥15.7 billion (US$60.3 million). Damage in Ehime Prefecture amounted to ¥676 million (US$2.17 million).

=== Typhoon Faye (Norming) ===
- Typhoon (JMA)
- Category 2 typhoon (SSHWS)
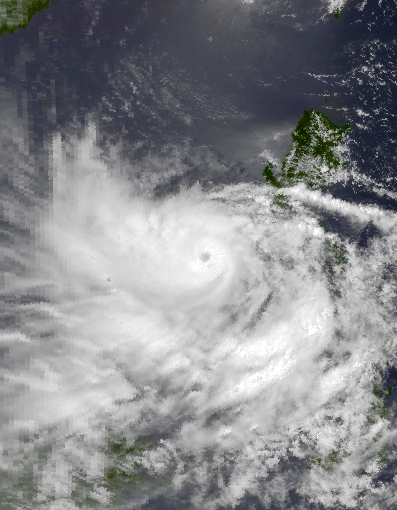
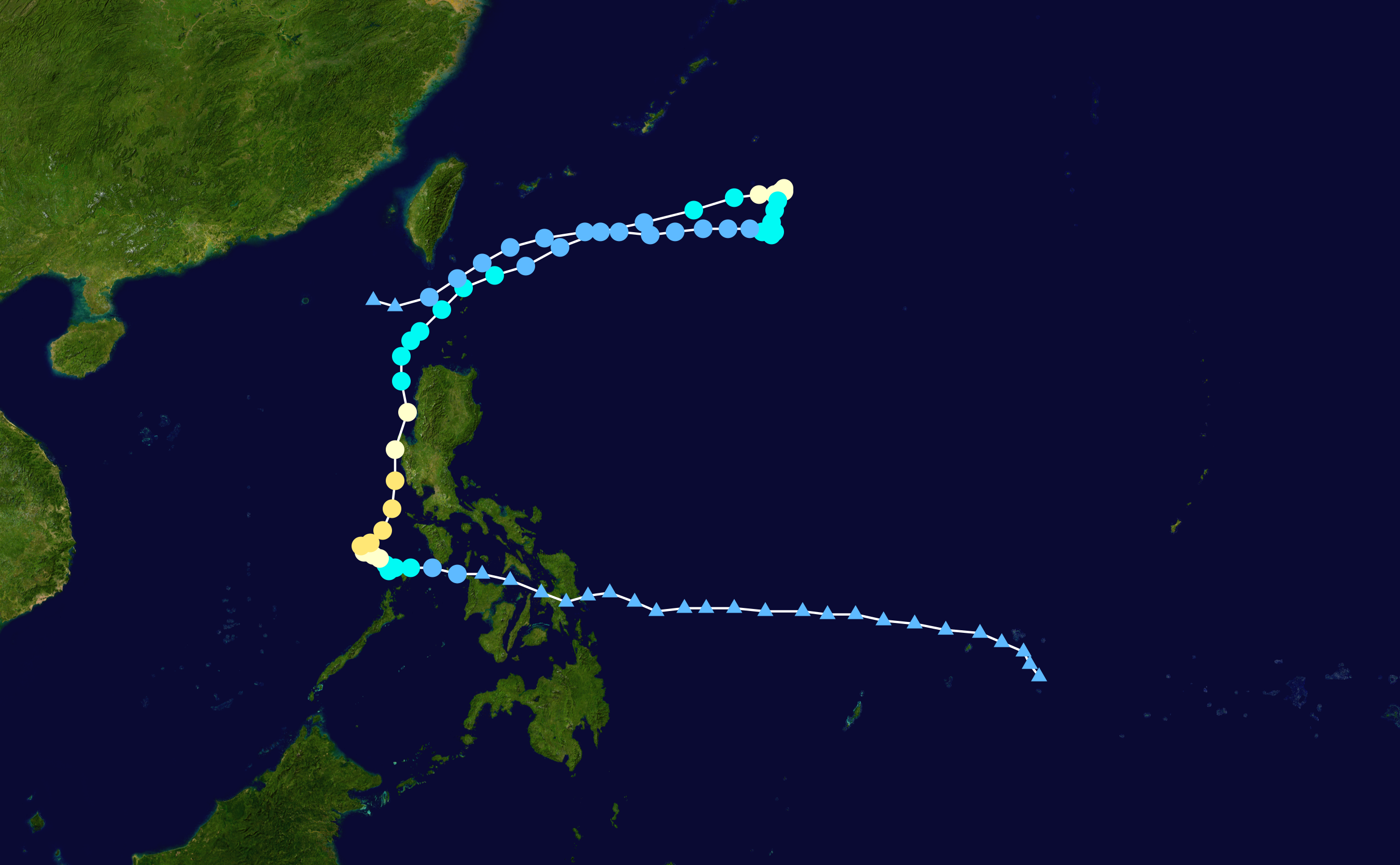
- Duration: August 20 – September 2
- Peak intensity: 150 km/h (90 mph) (10-min); 960 hPa (mbar)

On August 16, a weak tropical disturbance was moving towards the southern Philippines. Its low-level circulation was easily identified, since it was exposed, away from any deep convection. The system organized in the South China Sea, becoming a tropical depression by midday on August 21, a tropical storm that evening, and a typhoon on the night of August 22. A small cyclone, Faye moved northward on August 24 due to the weakening of a warm core ridge over China. By that evening, it reached its maximum intensity. On the morning of August 25, the cyclone strikes Luzon and rapidly weakens. Wallace Air Station reported gusts to 100 knots (190 km/h) during the passage of Faye. Thirty-two perished in the Philippines due to Faye.

Recurving to the northeast, Faye continued weakening due to vertical wind shear from Ellis, with dissipation as a tropical cyclone occurring on the afternoon of August 27. As a tropical depression, Faye moved east-northeast for a while before stalling between a mid-level trough and newly developed Tropical Storm Gordon. As Ellis retreated to the north, Faye began to reorganize with tropical storm status reattained on the morning of August 28 and typhoon status reached that night. Weakening began anew due to outflow from Typhoon Gordon, and the system became a tropical storm once more on the early morning of August 30. By August 31, a building ridge to Faye's north led to a southwest motion as the system continued to weaken. The cyclone became a tropical depression that evening, and drifted west for the next few days as an exposed low level circulation. The depression dissipated in the South China Sea on the afternoon of September 3.

=== Typhoon Gordon ===
- Very strong typhoon (JMA)
- Category 3 typhoon (SSHWS)
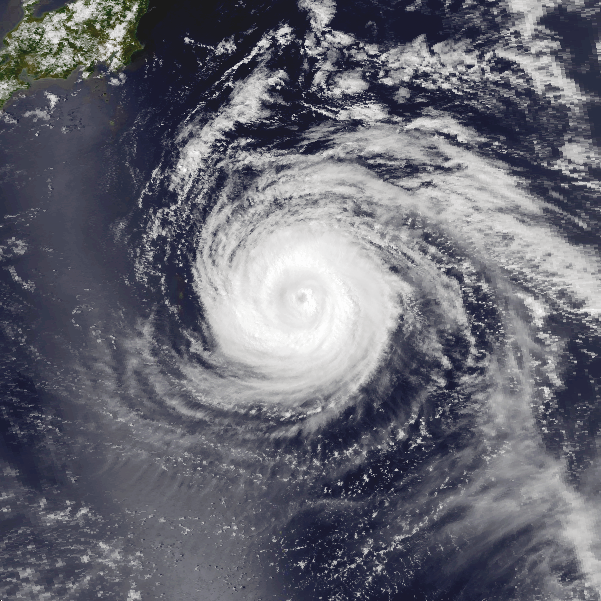
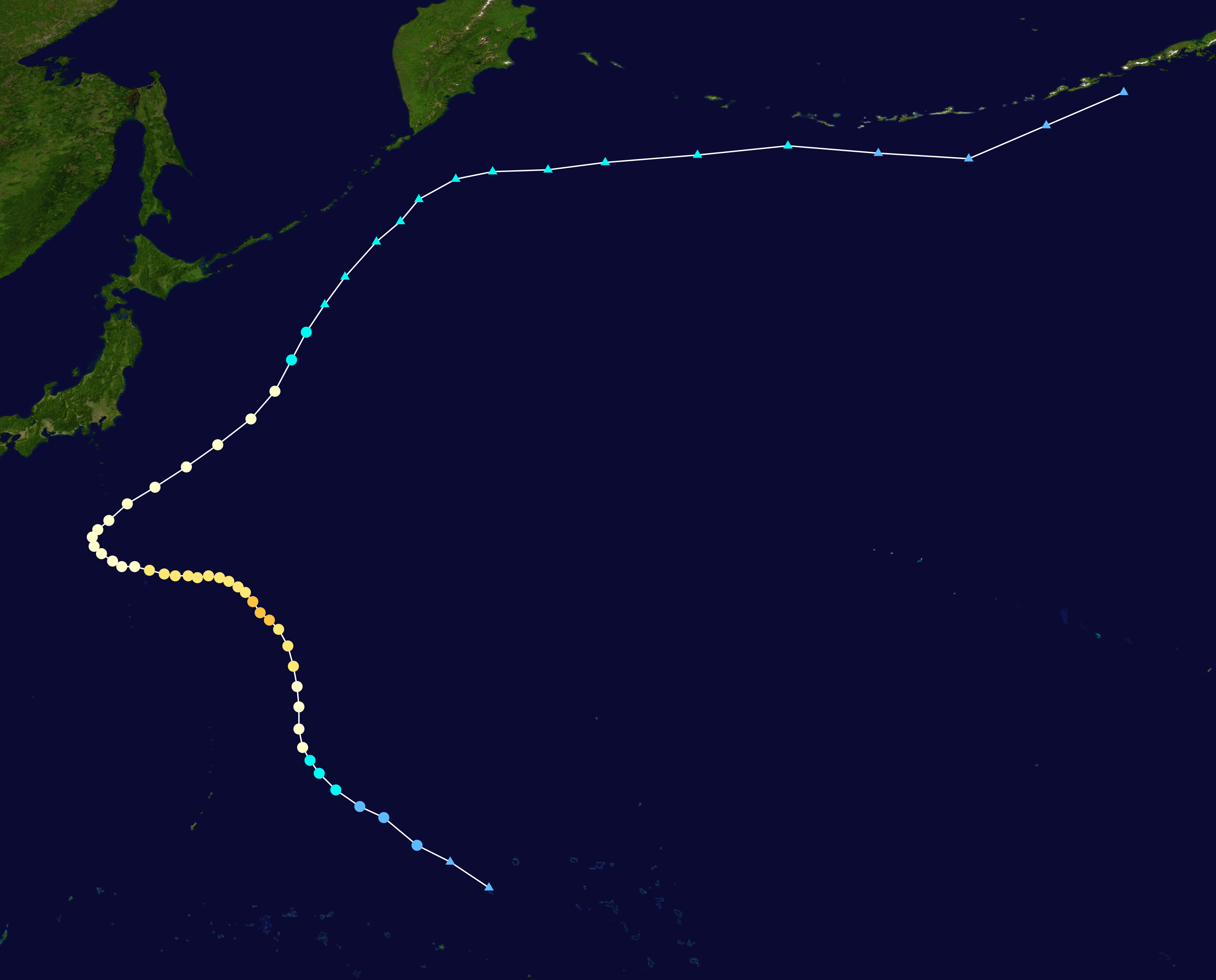
- Duration: August 26 – September 5
- Peak intensity: 165 km/h (105 mph) (10-min); 945 hPa (mbar)

The initial disturbance that led to Gordon's formation developed within the monsoon trough just west of the International Date Line. A surface circulation developed in associated with this convection on August 25 near 8N 163E. While upper ridging aloft existed, it was not until the following day that it developed directly over this disturbance. Moving northwest, rapid development began early on August 27, with tropical depression status achieved that morning and tropical storm intensity reached that afternoon. Gordon became a typhoon on the morning of August 28. By early on August 30, the cyclone reached its maximum intensity. A building ridge to its north directed Gordon westward until September 3, when its motion slowed. A shortwave trough deepened to its northwest, and the cyclone turned northward in response. By September 4, the cyclone was accelerating east to northeast, passing about 480 kilometres (300 mi) southeast of Tokyo, and the storm became extratropical early on the afternoon of September 5.

=== Severe Tropical Storm Hope (Pasing) ===
- Severe tropical storm (JMA)
- Tropical storm (SSHWS)
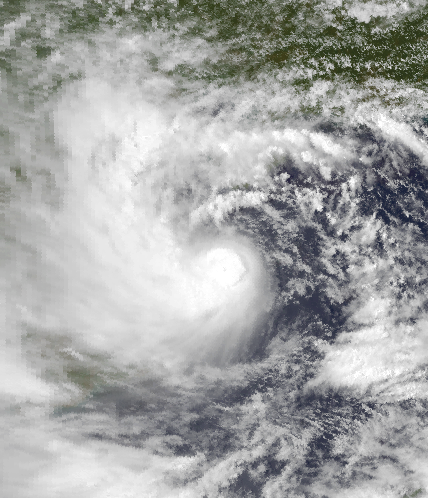
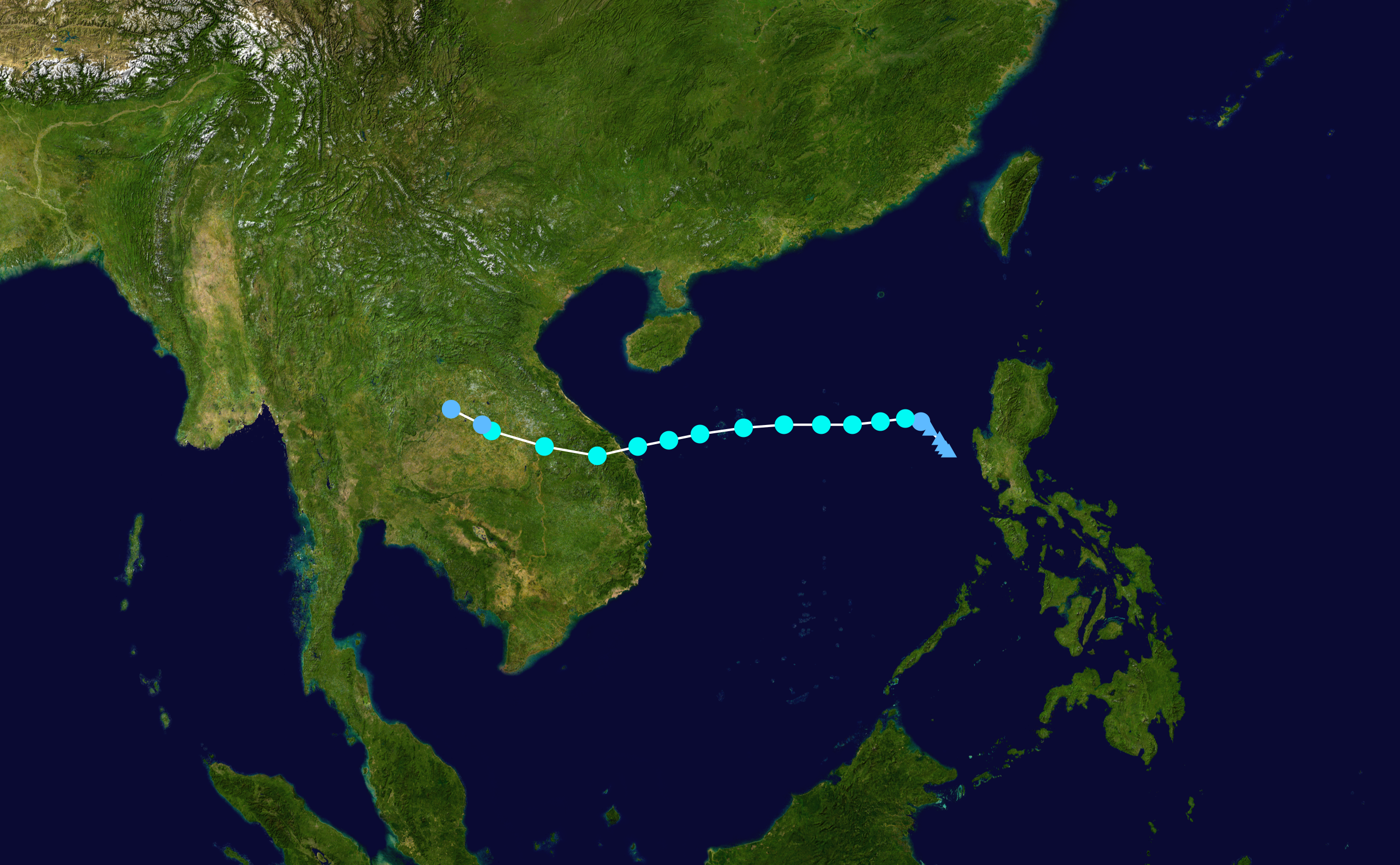
- Duration: September 4 – September 7
- Peak intensity: 100 km/h (65 mph) (10-min); 980 hPa (mbar)

A monsoon depression formed over the South China Sea on September 3. It deepened rapidly, becoming a tropical storm late on September 4. Moving quickly westward, it struck the coast of Vietnam south of Da Nang, then moved into the mountains of Laos and Vietnam as it rapidly dissipated. Significant flooding caused the evacuation of several thousand people and damaged the rice crop.

=== Typhoon Irving (Ruping) ===
- Very strong typhoon (JMA)
- Category 2 typhoon (SSHWS)
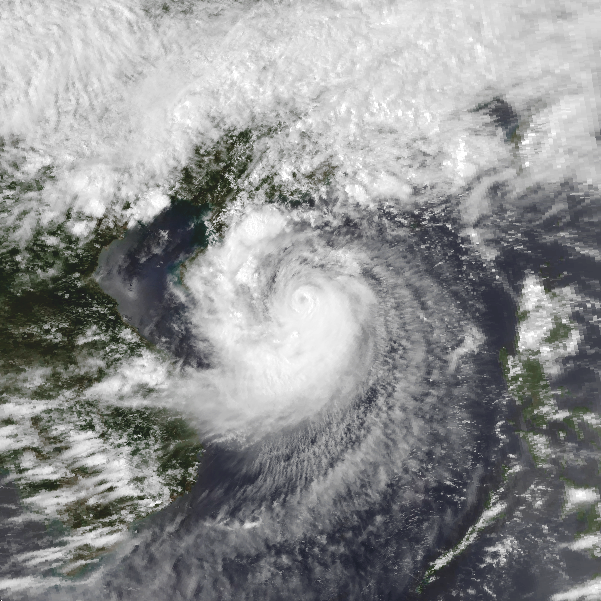
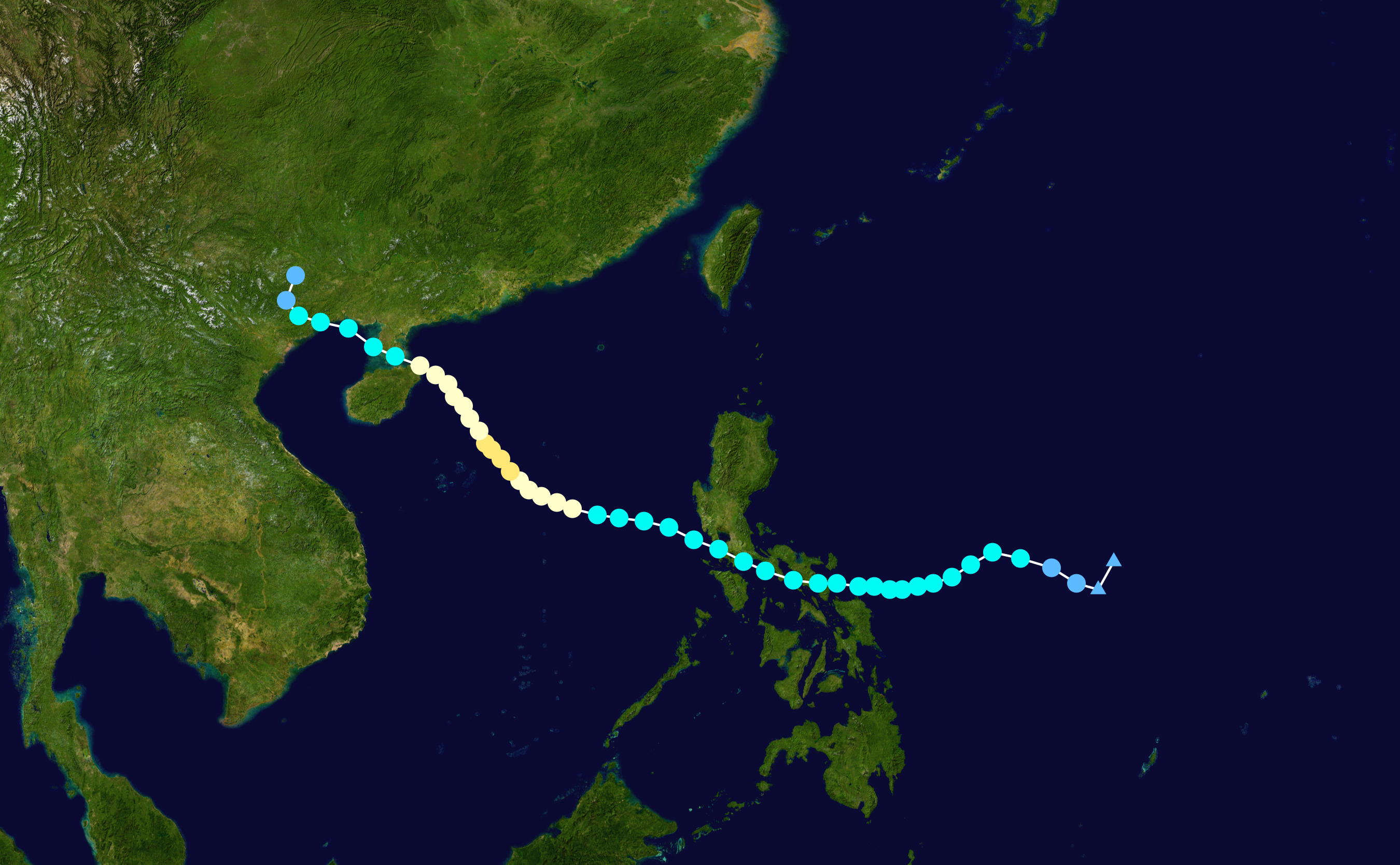
- Duration: September 5 – September 16
- Peak intensity: 155 km/h (100 mph) (10-min); 950 hPa (mbar)

An active monsoon trough was south of Guam. By late on September 4, a surface low was apparent near 11N 130E. Late the next day, it became a tropical depression while moving generally to the west. By the next morning, it had strengthened into a tropical storm. Late on September 8, the cyclone struck the southern tip of Luzon as a strong tropical storm. Moving through an inland sea route through the archipelago, Irving slightly weakened before turning northwest into the South China Sea. Irving became a compact typhoon while strengthening over open waters. Weakening back into a tropical storm due to land interaction with Hai-nan and mainland China, the system made landfall about 205 kilometres (127 mi) northeast of Hanoi, then rapidly dissipated as it moved inland.

Across the Philippines, Irving battered a dozen provinces in the southern section of Luzon, toppling trees and ripping off rooftops. Moreover, the storm also uprooted trees, downed power and telephone lines, triggered landslides and forced the cancellation of several domestic airline flights on Thursday. Schools were closed. Irving damaged 7,890 houses in Albay and Sorsogon provinces alone. As a result, 23,101 families, or about 138,500 people were listed as homeless. Throughout the country, 65 people were killed, 26 were hurt, and 29 were rendered missing. A total of 44,383 families or 248,040 residents were evacuated to shelter. In addition, 18,488 homes were damaged and 5,599 others were demolished. Damage in the country was assessed at US$23.3 million, including US$14.2 million in crops. (Note: All Philippine currencies are converted to United States Dollars using Philippines Measuring worth with an exchange rate of the year 1982.) Following the storm, President Ferdinand Marcos ordered for the release of $294,000 in aid. Across the Leizhou Peninsula, serious crop damage was reported and 90% of homes were damaged.

=== Typhoon Judy (Susang) ===
- Typhoon (JMA)
- Category 2 typhoon (SSHWS)
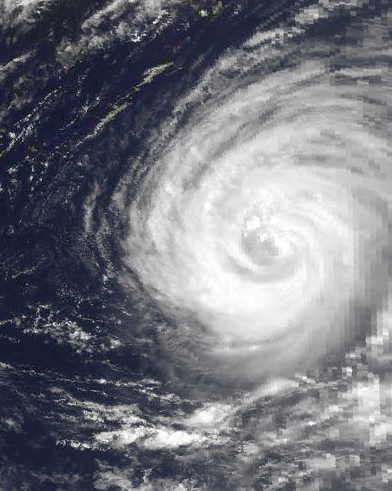
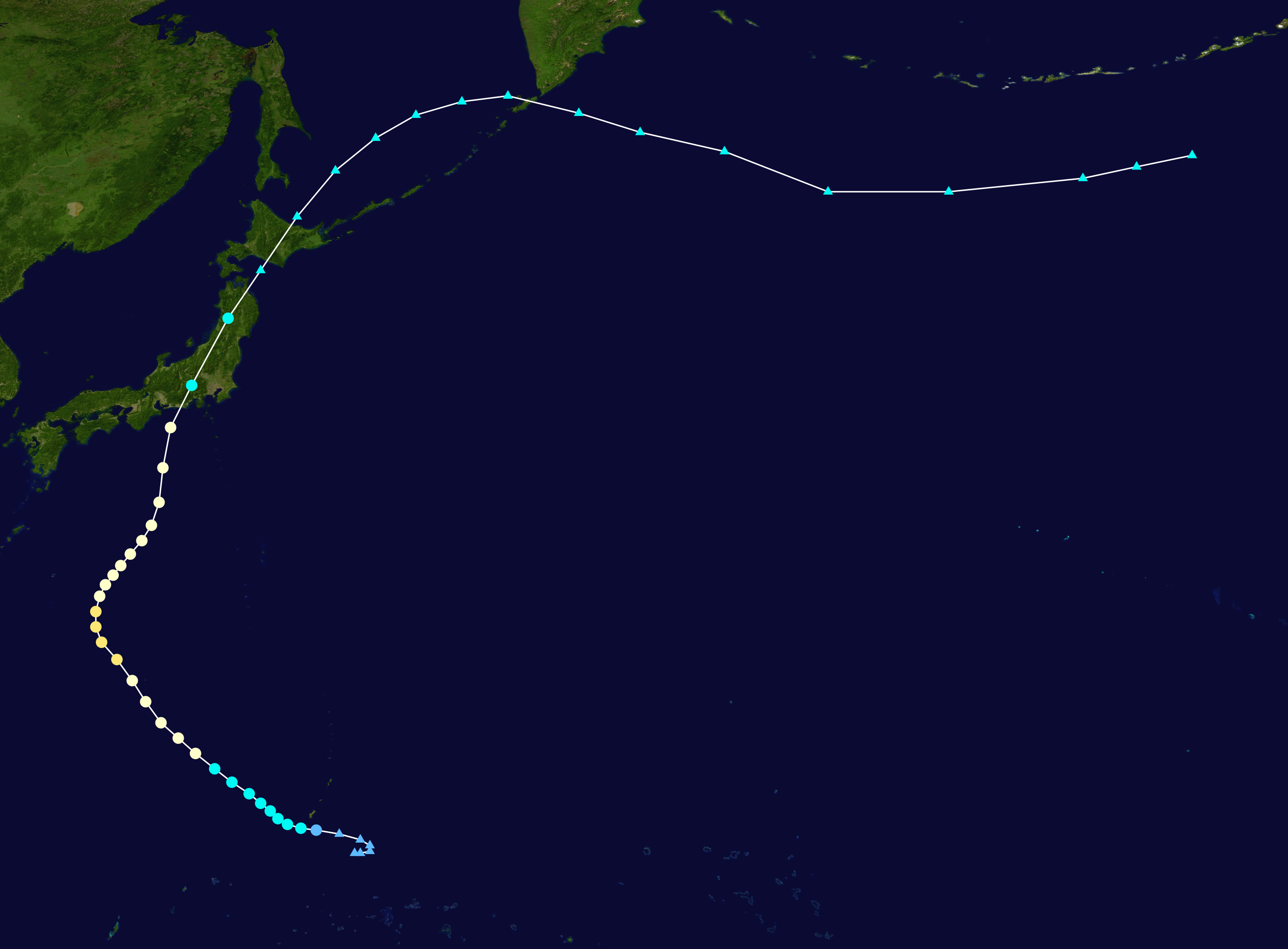
- Duration: September 5 – September 12
- Peak intensity: 150 km/h (90 mph) (10-min); 955 hPa (mbar)

Forming in tandem with Irving, Judy formed to the east of the Philippines as a tropical disturbance on September 4. In contrast to Irving, Judy's intensification was more rapid, becoming a tropical depression early on September 6, a tropical storm later that morning, and a typhoon on September 8 while tracking northwestward. On September 9, Judy appears to have ingested dry air from a nearly tropical upper tropospheric cyclone, as its central eye feature expanded significantly. A mid-latitude trough south of Korea swept Judy more northward, ultimately accelerating the storm towards Japan on September 11. When the 70 knots (130 km/h) Typhoon Judy hit southeastern Japan on September 12, its torrential rains left 25 dead and causing moderate damage. Extratropical transition had begun around that time, and Judy became an extratropical cyclone on September 13.

=== Typhoon Ken (Tering) ===
- Very strong typhoon (JMA)
- Category 3 typhoon (SSHWS)
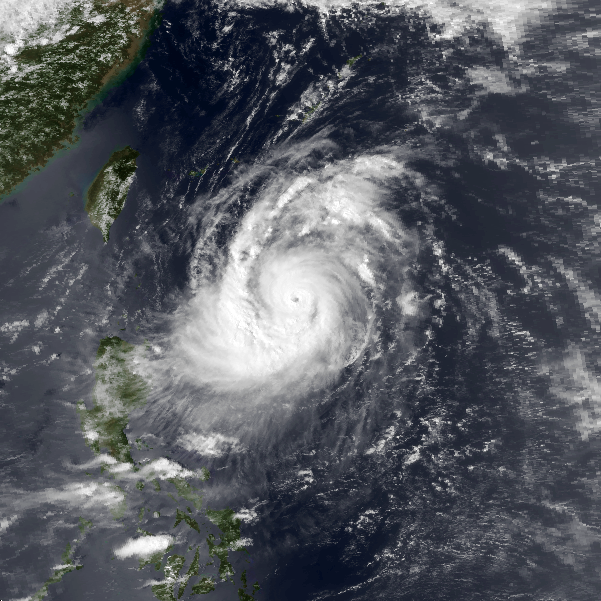
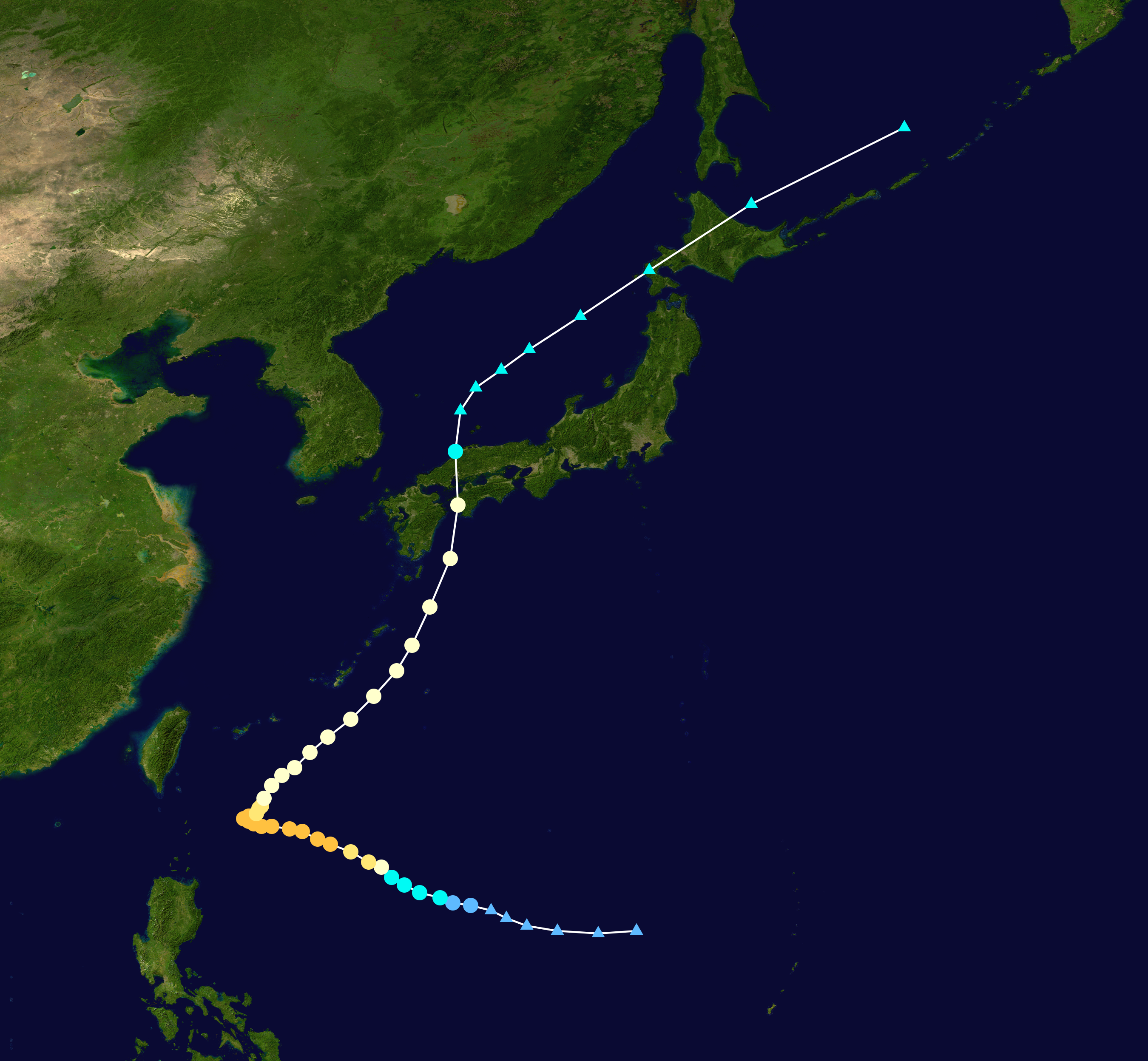
- Duration: September 15 – September 25
- Peak intensity: 175 km/h (110 mph) (10-min); 940 hPa (mbar)

Forming along the western end of the monsoon trough in the Philippine Sea, the convective disturbance was first noted on September 14. By the afternoon of September 16, the system had organized into a tropical depression, and by that night a tropical storm. As a compact system, rapid intensification continued, with Ken becoming a typhoon on the evening of September 17 and a major typhoon on September 18. The cyclone up to this point had a history of progressing slowly west-northwest, but Ken eventually stalled on September 20 and became a larger cyclone, possibly due to the ingestion of some cooler, drier air from its periphery. As a mid-latitude trough to its north deepened, Ken took off to the northeast towards Okinawa. On September 23, Ken brought significant rains to the island when 282 millimetres (11.1 in) were measured at Kadena. Weakening ensued thereafter due to interaction with the main belt of the Westerlies. Ken made landfall upon Shikoku early on September 25, and moved onward into the Sea of Japan where it evolved into an extratropical cyclone. The fourth typhoon of the season to strike Japan, Ken brought winds as high as 114 knots (211 km/h) and rainfall of 221 millimetres (8.7 in) within a six-hour period to Shikoku. Resultant mudslides damaged thousands of homes, and five people died.

=== Tropical Storm Lola ===
- Tropical storm (JMA)
- Tropical storm (SSHWS)
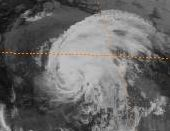
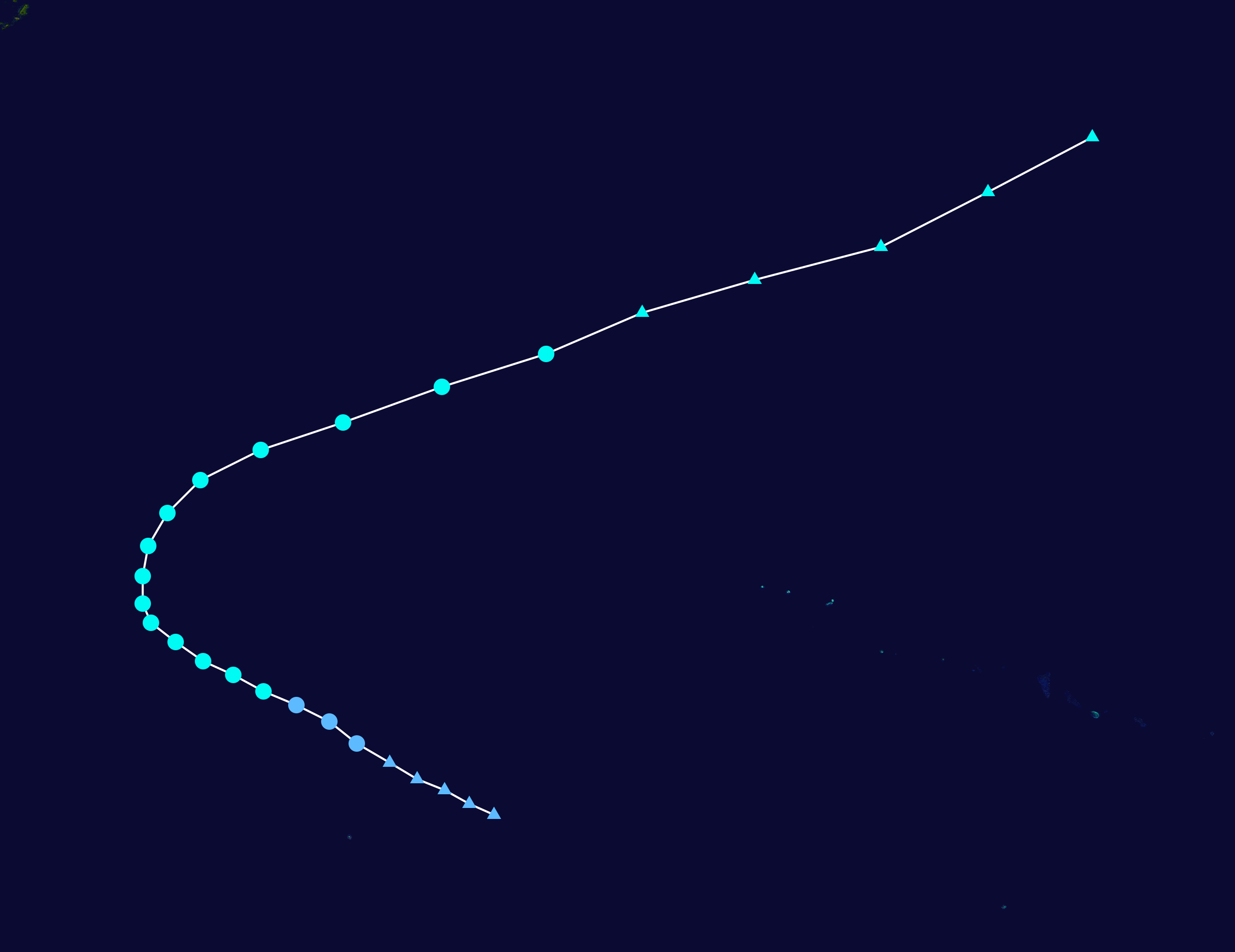
- Duration: September 15 – September 19
- Peak intensity: 85 km/h (50 mph) (10-min); 990 hPa (mbar)

Forming in proximity to the tropical upper tropospheric trough (TUTT), its initial disturbance was first spotted as a weak band of convection near the International Date Line in the subtropics on September 13. Slowly developing, a low pressure system was spotted with the thunderstorm activity on the morning of September 15. Becoming a tropical storm the following afternoon, Lola recurved around the western periphery of the subtropical ridge. The cyclone accelerated northeast on September 17, and by the morning of September 19, Lola had become an extratropical cyclone along the frontal zone which swept it out of the subtropics.

=== Tropical Depression 22W ===
- Tropical depression (JMA)
- Tropical depression (SSHWS)
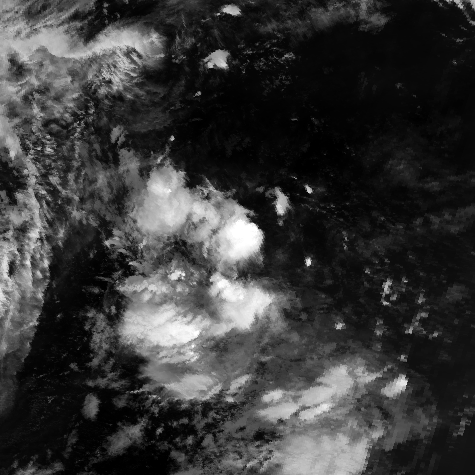
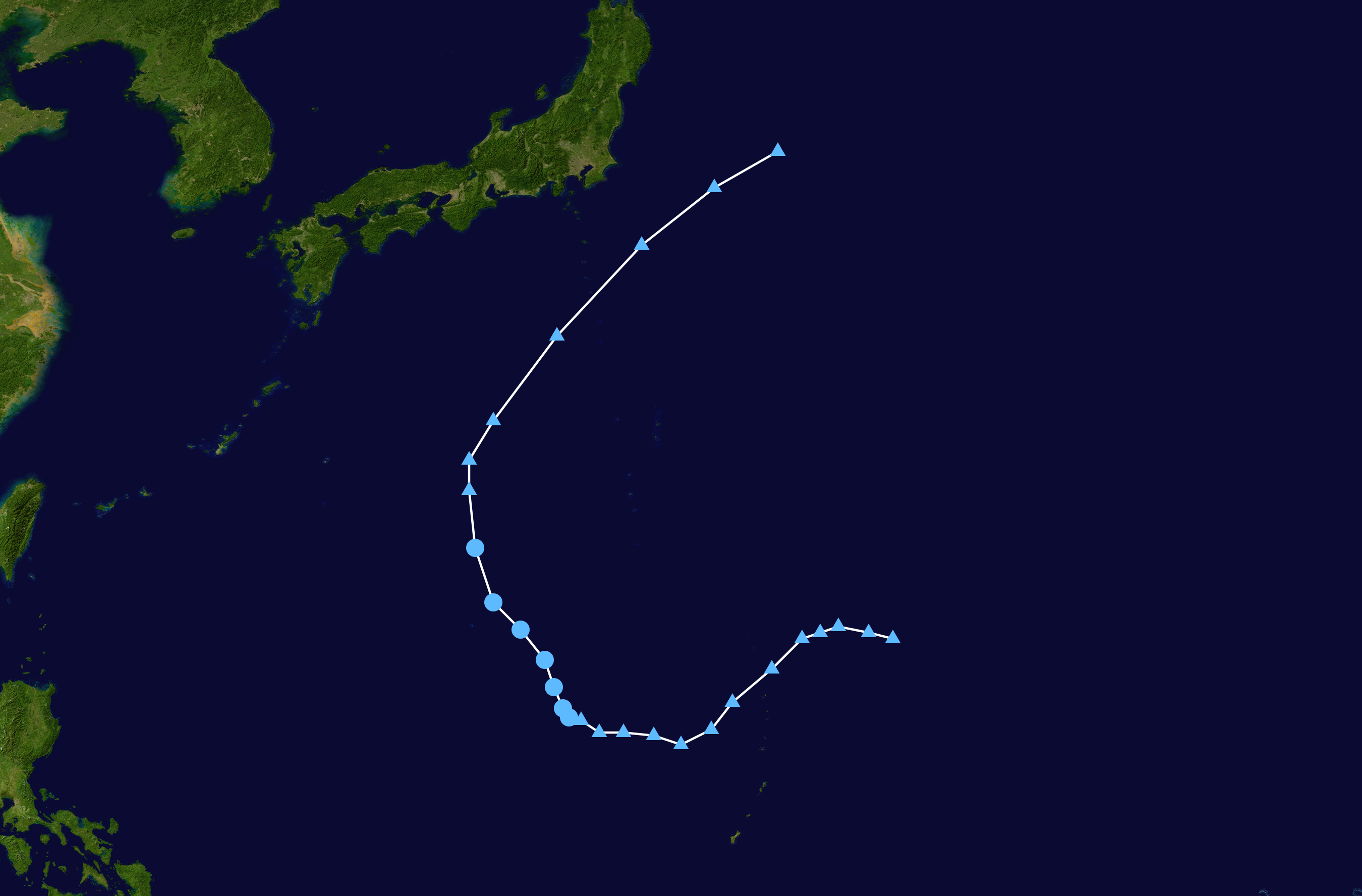
- Duration: September 18 – September 22
- Peak intensity: 55 km/h (35 mph) (10-min); 1004 hPa (mbar)

A short lived system, this cyclone followed in the wake of Ken. In fact, Ken's outflow kept the thunderstorm activity significantly removed from the depression's low level center for its entire existence. Moving northwest, numerous ship reports of 30 knots (56 km/h) winds led to the indication of this depression during the afternoon of September 21. The cyclone could not develop into a deep system due to the persistent wind shear as it began to round the western periphery of the subtropical ridge. By the afternoon of September 22, the cyclone weakened into a low-pressure area. This low developed into a small extratropical cyclone when it linked up with a frontal boundary southeast of Japan on September 24.

=== Typhoon Mac (Uding) ===
- Violent typhoon (JMA)
- Category 5 super typhoon (SSHWS)
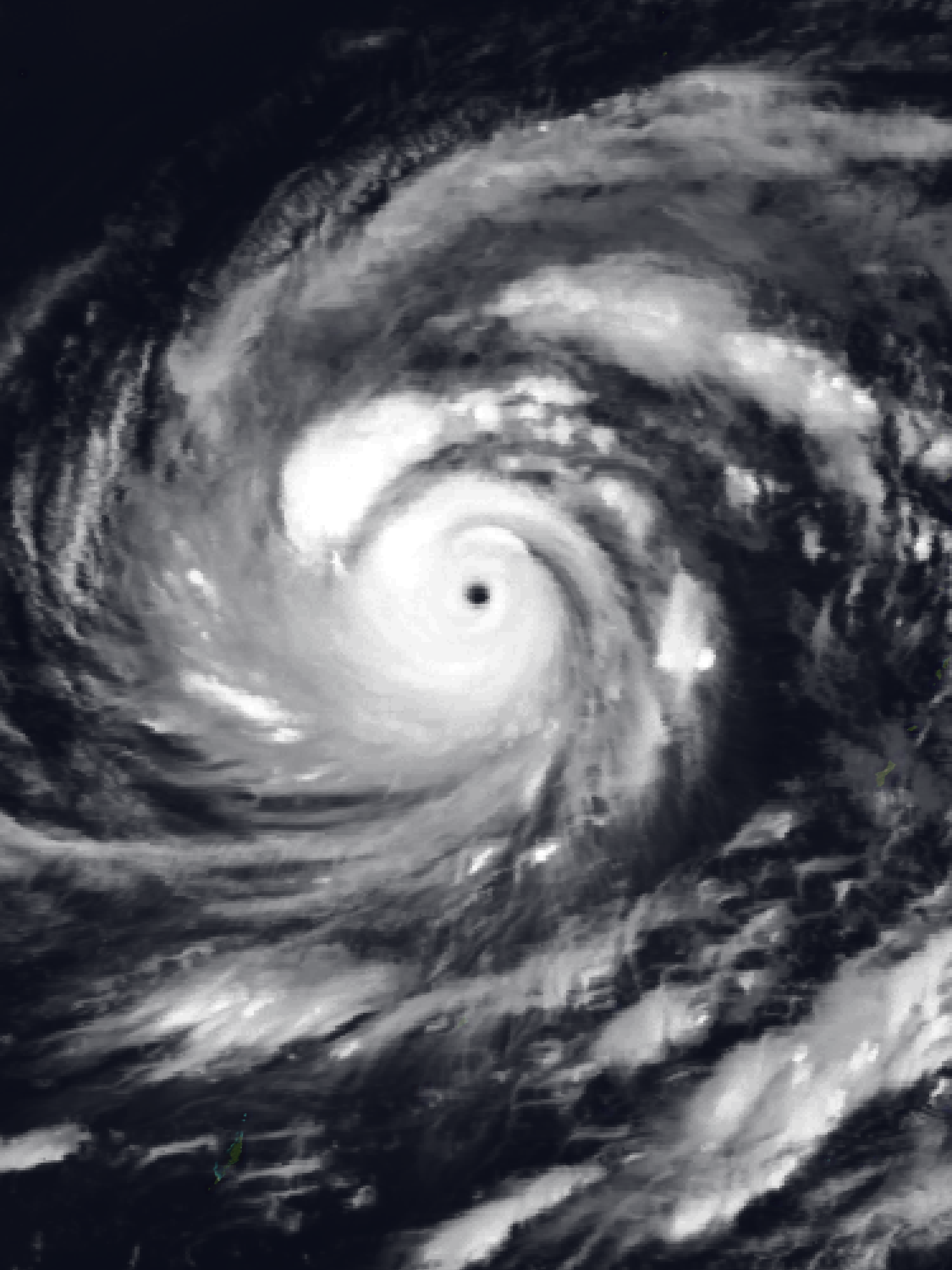
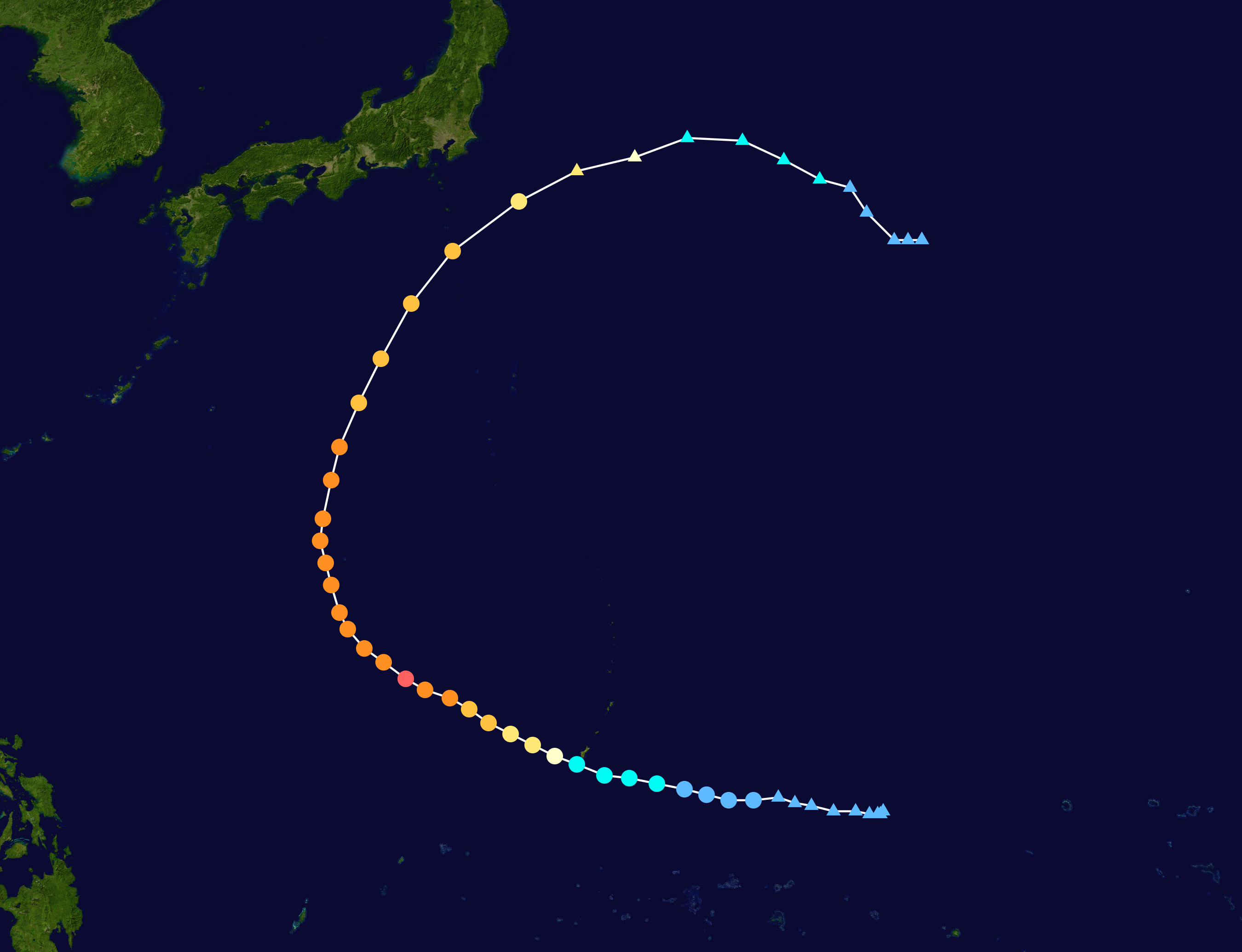
- Duration: October 1 – October 10
- Peak intensity: 220 km/h (140 mph) (10-min); 895 hPa (mbar)

A persistent surface circulation developed on September 28 east of Ponape. On October 1, the convection began to organize as the upper-level environment improved and the system became a tropical depression that night. Moving west-northwest, Mac passed nearby Guam as a strong tropical storm on the morning of October 3. Heavy rains and high winds in the southern part of the island led to US$1.5 million (1982 dollars) in damage. Continuing to intensify rapidly, Mac soon became a typhoon, and by October 5 had become a super typhoon. Recurving northwest, the storm travelled into a weakness in the subtropical ridge, accelerating north-northeast as it passed the ridge axis by October 6. Acceleration into the main belt of the Westerlies continued while the cyclone slowly weakened, and Mac evolved into a typhoon-strength extratropical cyclone on the afternoon of October 9.

=== Typhoon Nancy (Weling) ===
- Very strong typhoon (JMA)
- Category 4 typhoon (SSHWS)
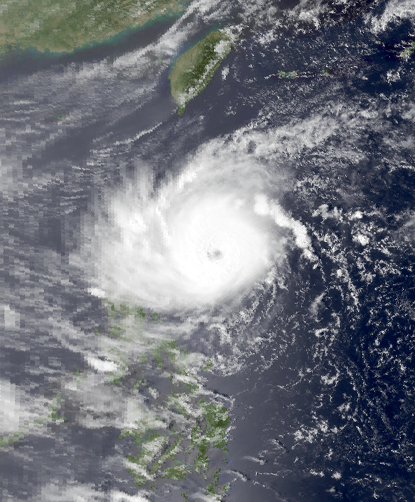
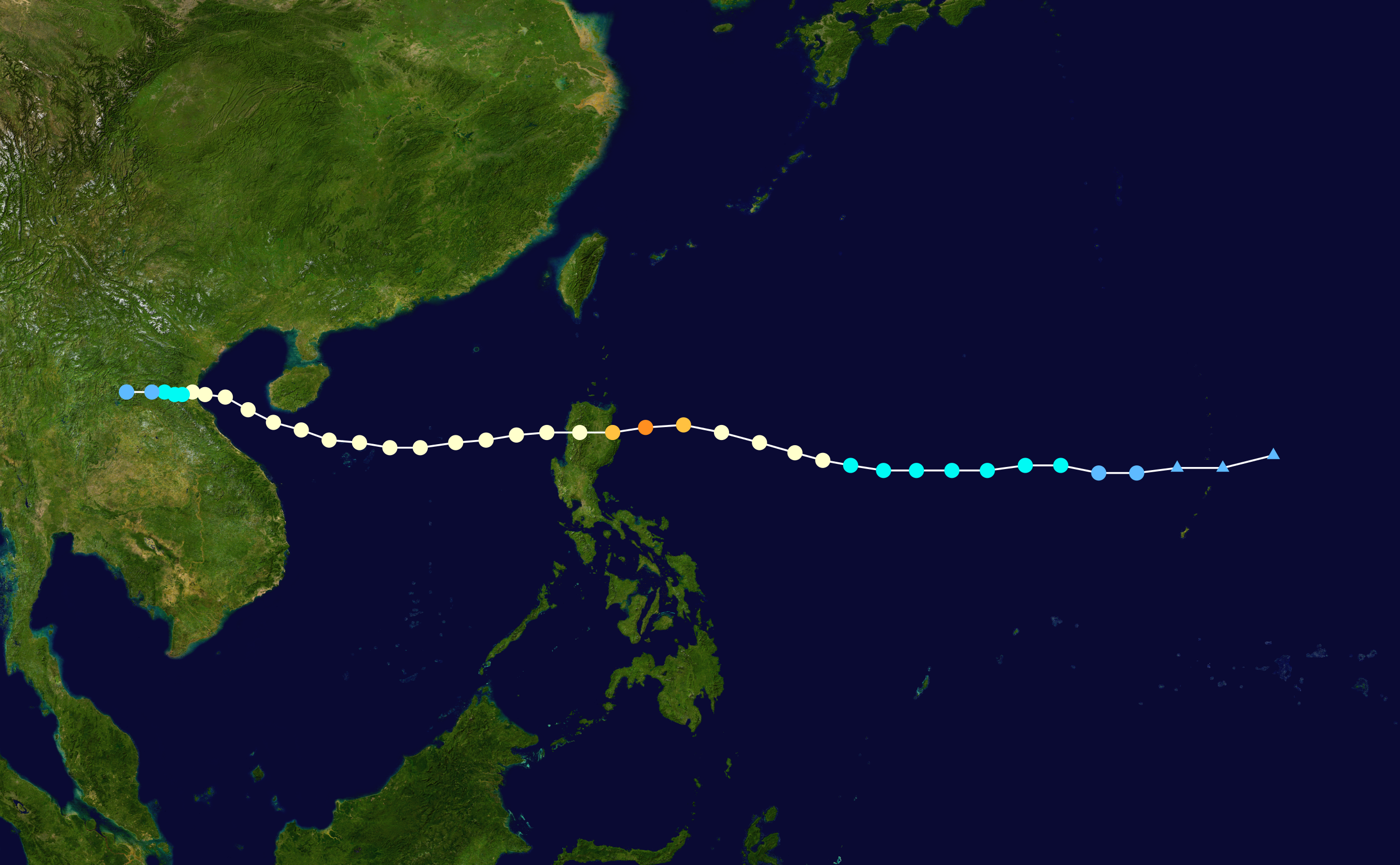
- Duration: October 10 – October 20
- Peak intensity: 185 km/h (115 mph) (10-min); 935 hPa (mbar)

Typhoon Nancy, which developed on October 10, hit eastern Luzon on October 14. Its winds were reduced to tropical storm strength, but Nancy re-intensified to an 80 knots (150 km/h) typhoon over the South China Sea. It hit northern Vietnam on the October 18, and dissipated shortly thereafter. The heavy rains accompanied by the system caused 309 fatalities and over US$46 million in damage (1982 dollars).

=== Tropical Depression 25W (Yaning) ===
- Tropical depression (JMA)
- Tropical depression (SSHWS)
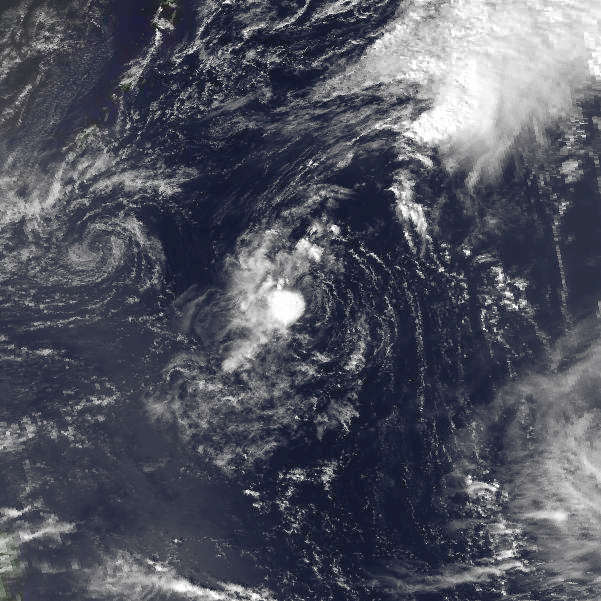
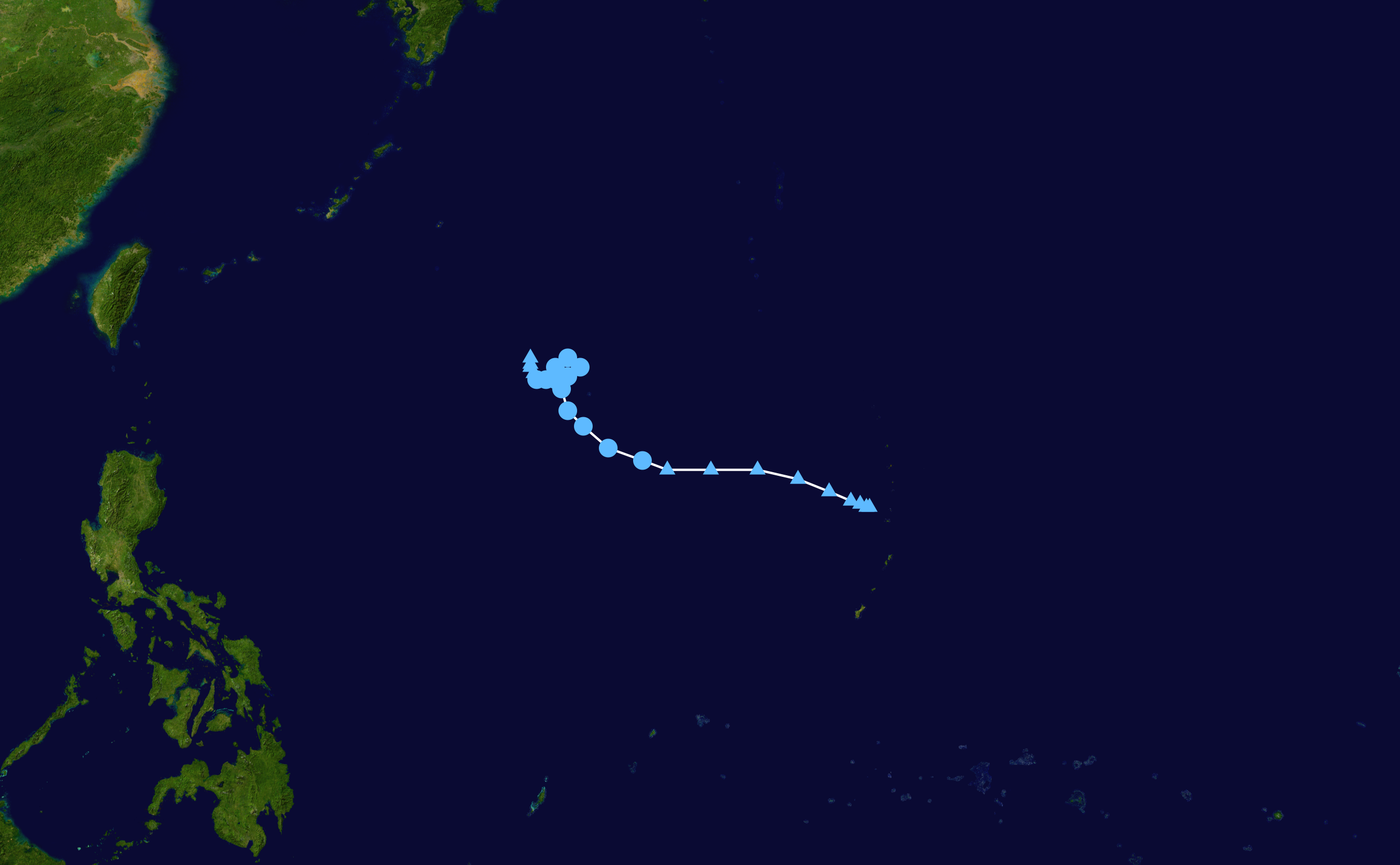
- Duration: October 14 – October 19
- Peak intensity: 45 km/h (30 mph) (10-min); 1004 hPa (mbar)

A weak circulation formed near 18N 141E on October 14. Moving westward, it developed into a tropical depression on the morning of October 15. Convection near the center soon weakened, and it became an exposed low level swirl on October 16. Progressing northwest, this low level circulation maintained its identity for another couple days. On October 18, some convective bands returned to the system. Early on October 19, the circulation became involved with the developing Typhoon Owen, and was absorbed.

=== Typhoon Owen ===
- Very strong typhoon (JMA)
- Category 3 typhoon (SSHWS)
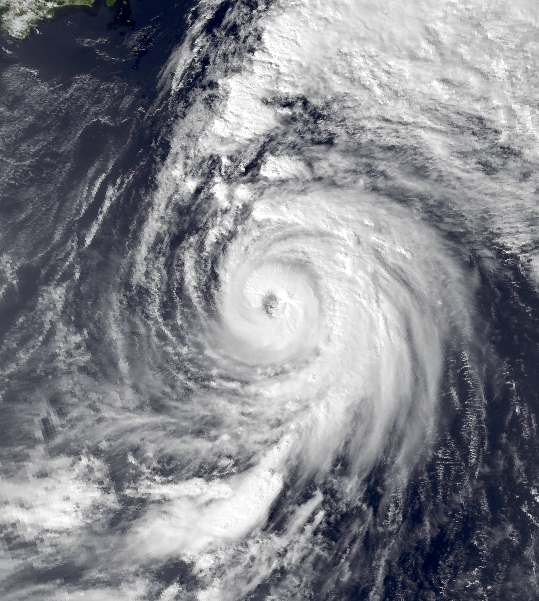
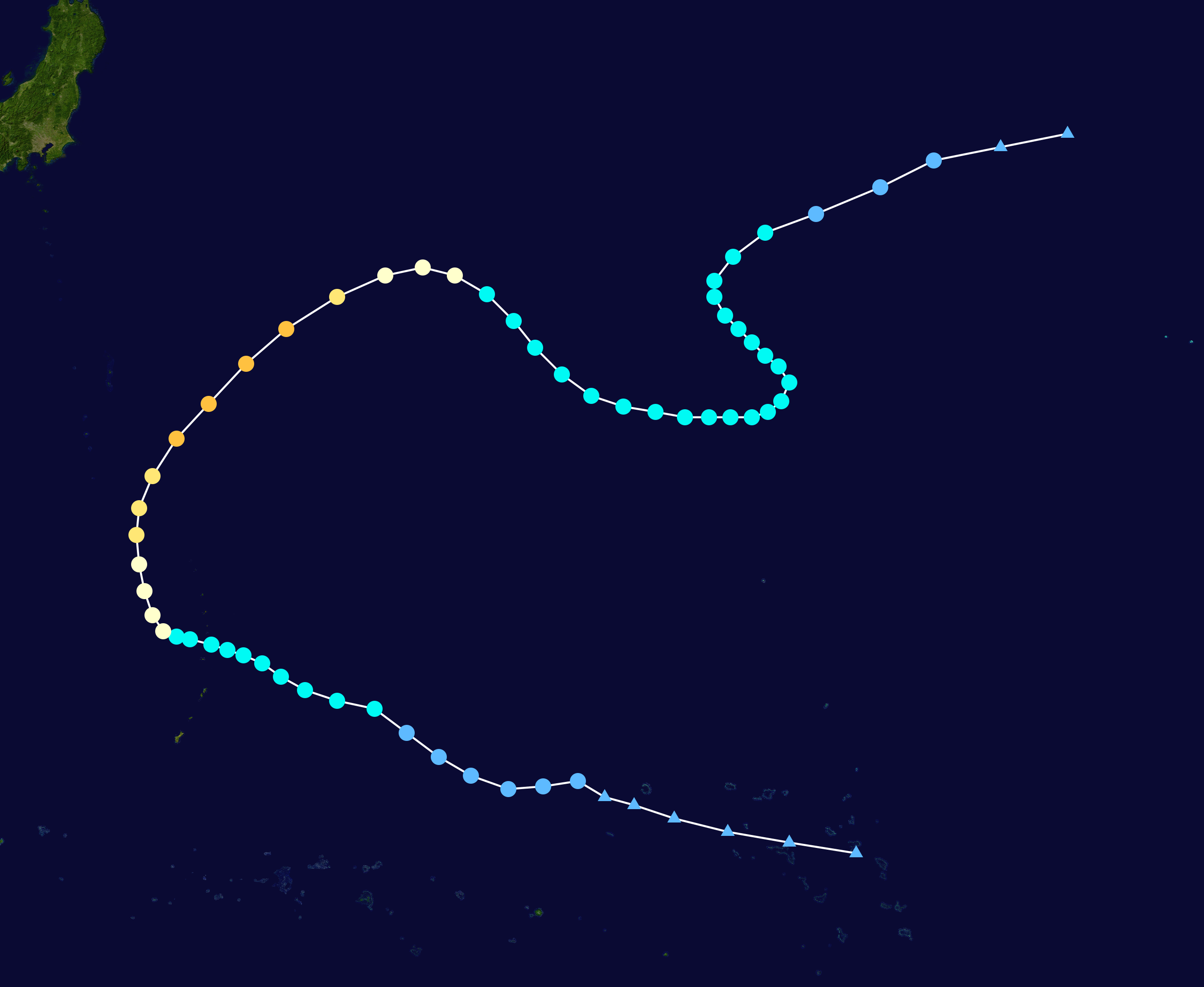
- Duration: October 14 – October 27
- Peak intensity: 165 km/h (105 mph) (10-min); 940 hPa (mbar)

The last cyclone of an active 14‑week period, Owen developed from a disturbance east of Kwajalein on October 13. Slow development ensued as it moved west-northwest, and by early October 16 it achieved tropical depression status. Northerly vertical wind shear tilted the system to the south with height, and slowed development. By October 19, Owen became a typhoon as it slowed and turned more to the north. As it picked up forward speed during recurvature, it reached its peak intensity during the afternoon of October 20. Thereafter, the system began to shear from the south, its wind field expanded, and extratropical transition had begun. Owen became an extratropical cyclone on the morning of October 22. The system then was blocked from fully recurving into the Westerlies, and turned to the southeast and south. Convection increased south of the center on October 23, and Owen became a tropical cyclone once more with active central convection on October 24. The system moved eastward as a tropical storm for the next day. By October 25, Owen turned back to the north and began to lose its thunderstorm activity once more. Weakening back into a tropical depression, Owen eventually dissipated in the warm sector of an approaching extratropical cyclone late on October 27 after tracking over 6,600 kilometres (4,100 mi).

=== Typhoon Pamela (Aning) ===
- Very strong typhoon (JMA)
- Category 3 typhoon (SSHWS)
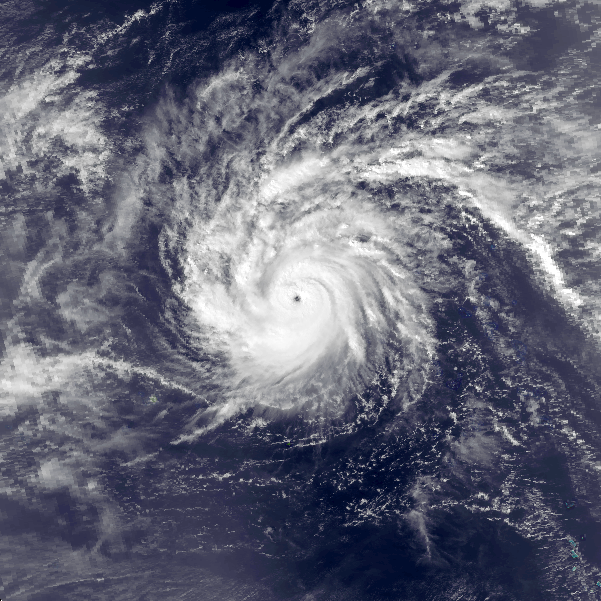
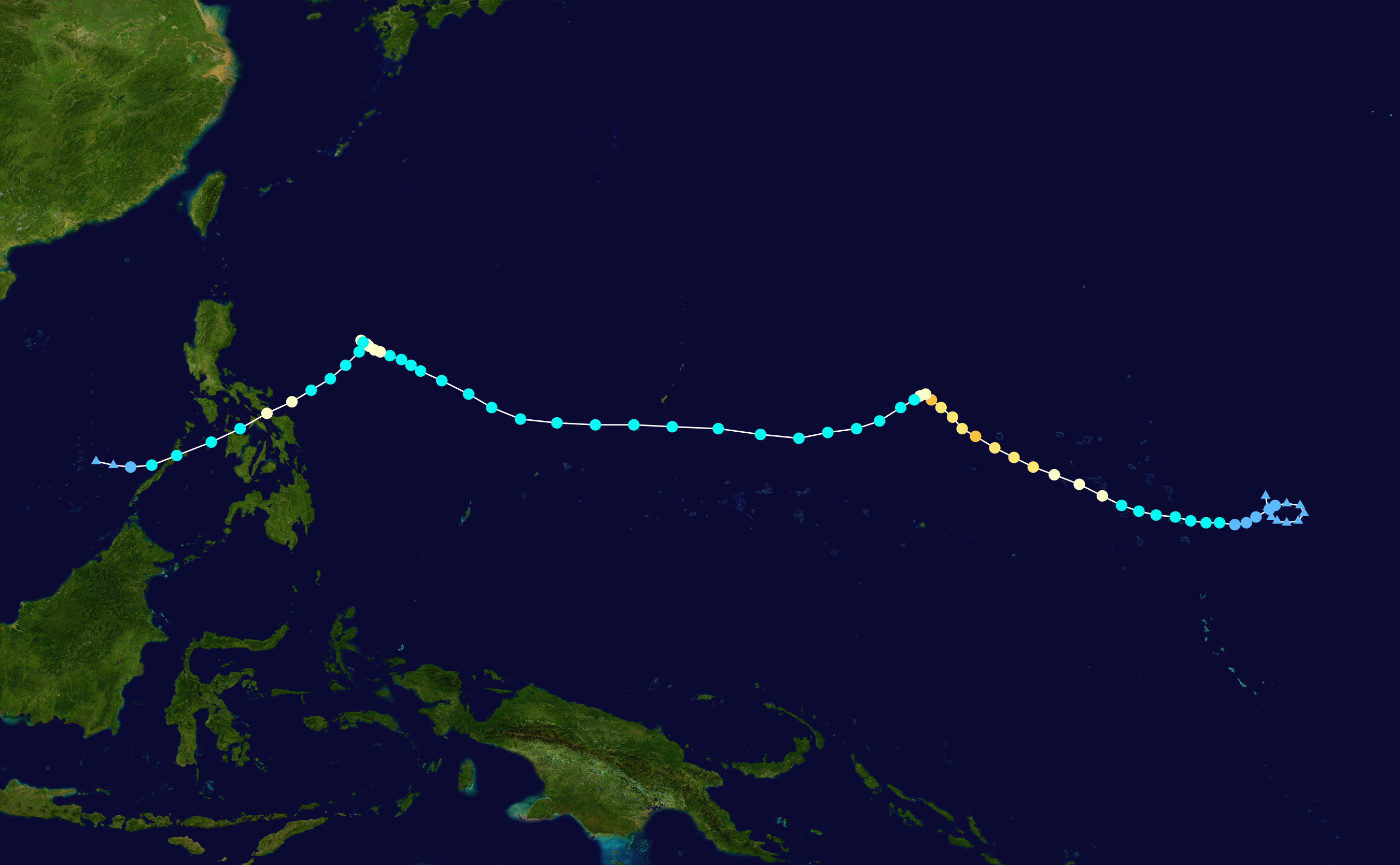
- Duration: November 23 – December 8
- Peak intensity: 165 km/h (105 mph) (10-min); 940 hPa (mbar)

On November 21, an area of convection west of the International Date Line organized into a tropical disturbance. It looped, then tracked to the west where it strengthened into tropical depression 27W on November 23, In the next day it was named Tropical Storm Pamela on November 24. It continued west-northwestward, reaching typhoon intensity on the 26th. Pamela reached a peak of 100 knots (190 km/h) winds as it crossed the Marshall Islands. As it continued westward, Pamela threatened Guam, six years after the devastating typhoon of the same name. It approached the island as a weakened tropical storm on December 1, but only brought minor winds and damage. Pamela looped to the southwest on the 4th, strengthened to a typhoon but weakened back to a tropical storm. It restrengthened to a typhoon just before hitting the Philippines on the 7th. The storm dissipated on the 9th, after causing moderate to extensive damage to the islands of the West Pacific.

Aning damaged 84 homes and caused ₱100,000 (US$12,000) worth of damage in the Philippines.

=== Severe Tropical Storm Roger (Bidang) ===
- Severe tropical storm (JMA)
- Category 1 typhoon (SSHWS)
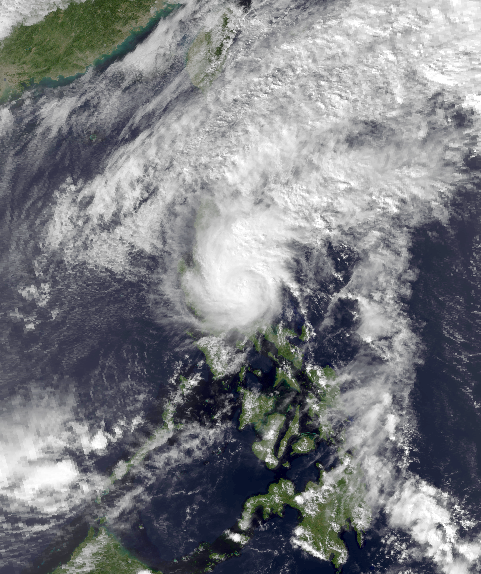
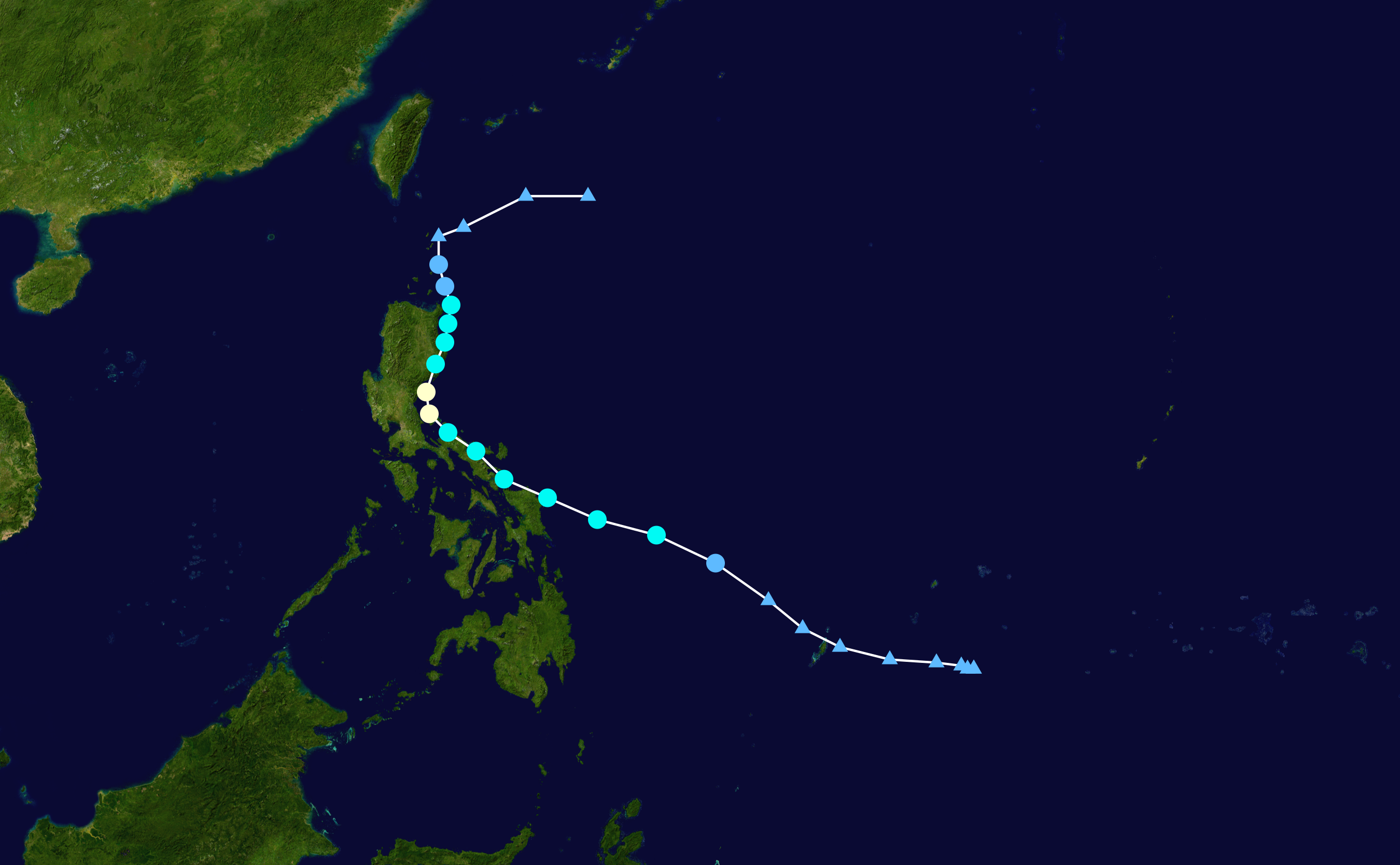
- Duration: December 7 – December 11
- Peak intensity: 110 km/h (70 mph) (10-min); 980 hPa (mbar)

Following quickly behind Pamela, this system was slow to initially organize. A large area of thunderstorm activity was spotted on the afternoon of December 3 about 2,200 kilometres (1,400 mi) southeast of Pamela. The convective system moved west-northwest at 10 knots, shadowing Pamela. Upper-level outflow from Pamela was leading to moderate to strong vertical wind shear over the disturbance, explaining its slow development. Early on December 7, both Pamela's and Roger's centers were as close as 1,110 kilometres (690 mi) from each other. Vertical wind shear finally lessened as Pamela weakened over the Philippines, allowing Roger to rapidly develop into a tropical storm late on December 8 and a typhoon on the morning of December 10. Moving northwest along the coast of the Philippines, Roger weakened back into a tropical storm. Vertical wind shear increased again, which combined with land interaction quickly weakened the tropical cyclone. By early afternoon on December 10, the cyclone became ill-defined and no longer qualified as a tropical cyclone. Moving northeast away from the Philippines, Roger's remains were absorbed into an approaching frontal zone on December 12.

Bidang caused ₱14.4 million (US$1.69 million) worth of damage in the Philippines.

== Storm names ==
During the season 26 named tropical cyclones developed in the Western Pacific and were named by the Joint Typhoon Warning Center, when it was determined that they had become tropical storms. These names were contributed to a revised list from 1979.

Mamie	Nelson	Odessa	Pat	Ruby	Skip	Tess	Val	Winona	Andy	Bess	Cecil	Dot
Ellis	Faye	Gordon	Hope	Irving	Judy	Ken	Lola	Mac	Nancy	Owen	Pamela	Roger

=== Philippines ===
Akang	Bising	Klaring	Deling	Emang
Gading	Heling	Iliang	Loleng	Miding
Norming	Oyang	Pasing	Ruping	Susang
Tering	Uding	Weling	Yaning	
Auxiliary list
				Aning
Bidang	Katring (unused)	Delang (unused)	Esang (unused)	Garding (unused)

The Philippine Atmospheric, Geophysical and Astronomical Services Administration uses its own naming scheme for tropical cyclones in their area of responsibility. PAGASA assigns names to tropical depressions that form within their area of responsibility and any tropical cyclone that might move into their area of responsibility. Should the list of names for a given year prove to be insufficient, names are taken from an auxiliary list, the first 6 of which are published each year before the season starts. Names not retired from this list will be used again in the 1986 season. This is the same list used for the 1978 season. PAGASA uses its own naming scheme that starts in the Filipino alphabet, with names of Filipino female names ending with "ng" (A, B, K, D, etc.). Names that were not assigned/going to use are marked in gray.

=== Retirement ===
Due to extensive damage in Japan by Typhoon Bess, the name Bess was retired and later replaced by Brenda, which was first used in the 1985 season.

For unknown reasons, Pamela was decommissioned. Pamela was later replaced by Peggy, which was first used in the 1986 season.

== Season effects ==
This table will list all the storms that developed in the northwestern Pacific Ocean west of the International Date Line and north of the equator during 1982. It will include their intensity, duration, name, areas affected, deaths, missing persons (in parentheses), and damage totals. Classification and intensity values will be based on estimations conducted by the JMA. All damage figures will be in 1982 USD. Damages and deaths from a storm will include when the storm was a precursor wave or an extratropical low.

Name	Dates	Peak intensity			Areas affected	Damage (USD)	Deaths	Ref(s).
Name	Dates	Category	Wind speed	Pressure	Areas affected	Damage (USD)	Deaths	Ref(s).
TD	January 19	Tropical depression	Not specified	1006 hPa (29.71 inHg)	None	None	None	
Mamie (Akang)	March 15 – 24	Severe Tropical storm	95 km/h (59 mph)	990 hPa (29.23 inHg)	Philippines, Vietnam	$1.01 million	54	
Nelson (Bising)	March 18 – 31	Very strong typhoon	185 km/h (115 mph)	935 hPa (27.61 inHg)	Palau, Philippines	$12.6 million	112 (91)	
Odessa	March 29 – April 4	Strong typhoon	140 km/h (87 mph)	965 hPa (28.50 inHg)	Federated States of Micronesia	None	None	
Pat (Klaring)	May 16 – 24	Very strong typhoon	165 km/h (103 mph)	945 hPa (27.91 inHg)	Philippines	None	None	
TD	June 12	Tropical depression	Not specified	1010 hPa (29.83 inHg)	Mariana Islands	None	None	
TD	June 13	Tropical depression	Not specified	1008 hPa (29.77 inHg)	Philippines	None	None	
Ruby	June 20 – 27	Strong typhoon	130 km/h (81 mph)	975 hPa (28.79 inHg)	Palau, Mariana Islands, Japan	None	None (23)	
Tess–Val (Deling)	June 25 – July 3	Tropical storm	85 km/h (53 mph)	985 hPa (29.09 inHg)	China, Taiwan, Ryukyu Islands	None	None	
Skip	June 29 – July 1	Tropical storm	85 km/h (53 mph)	992 hPa (29.29 inHg)	None	None	None	
TD	June 30 – July 1	Tropical depression	Not specified	1000 hPa (29.53 inHg)	None	None	None	
Winona (Emang)	July 10 – 17	Severe tropical storm	95 km/h (59 mph)	985 hPa (29.09 inHg)	Philippines, China	$2.2 million	10 (2)	
Gading	July 17 – 19	Tropical depression	55 km/h (34 mph)	1,006 hPa (29.71 inHg)	Philippines	None	None	
Heling	July 21 – 23	Tropical depression	55 km/h (34 mph)	1004 hPa (29.71 inHg)	None	None	None	
Andy (Iliang)	July 21 – 31	Very strong typhoon	185 km/h (115 mph)	930 hPa (27.47 inHg)	Mariana Islands, Taiwan, China	$31.3 million	14	
Bess	July 21 – August 3	Violent typhoon	230 km/h (140 mph)	900 hPa (26.58 inHg)	Japan	$2.32 billion	95	
Cecil (Loleng)	August 4 – 14	Very strong typhoon	155 km/h (96 mph)	920 hPa (27.17 inHg)	Taiwan, China, South Korea, North Korea	$30 million	54	
Dot (Miding)	August 5 – 18	Strong typhoon	150 km/h (93 mph)	960 hPa (28.35 inHg)	Taiwan, China	Unknown	None	
Ellis (Oyang)	August 18 – 27	Very strong typhoon	185 km/h (115 mph)	915 hPa (27.02 inHg)	Japan	$62.5 million	5	
Faye (Norming)	August 20 – September 2	Strong typhoon	150 km/h (93 mph)	960 hPa (28.35 inHg)	Philippines, Taiwan	$1.76 million	29 (23)	
Gordon	August 26 – September 5	Very strong typhoon	165 km/h (103 mph)	945 hPa (27.91 inHg)	None	None	None	
Hope (Pasing)	September 4 – 7	Severe tropical storm	100 km/h (62 mph)	980 hPa (28.94 inHg)	Vietnam	Unknown	None	
Irving (Ruping)	September 5 – 16	Very strong typhoon	155 km/h (96 mph)	950 hPa (28.06 inHg)	Philippines, China	$13 million	65 (29)	
Judy (Susang)	September 5 – 12	Strong typhoon	150 km/h (93 mph)	955 hPa (28.20 inHg)	Japan	$505 million	26 (8)	
TD	September 10 – 12	Tropical depression	Not specified	1002 hPa (29.59 inHg)	None	None	None	
Ken (Tering)	September 15 – 25	Very strong typhoon	175 km/h (109 mph)	940 hPa (27.76 inHg)	Japan	$154,000	5	
Lola	September 15 – 19	Tropical storm	85 km/h (53 mph)	990 hPa (29.23 inHg)	None	None	None	
22W	September 18 – 22	Tropical depression	45 km/h (28 mph)	1004 hPa (29.65 inHg)	Mariana Islands	None	None	
TD	September 28	Tropical depression	Not specified	1008 hPa (29.77 inHg)	None	None	None	
Mac (Uding)	October 1 – 10	Violent typhoon	220 km/h (140 mph)	895 hPa (26.43 inHg)	Mariana Islands, Japan	$1.5 million	None	
Nancy (Weling)	October 10 – 20	Very strong typhoon	185 km/h (115 mph)	935 hPa (27.61 inHg)	Philippines, Vietnam	$56 million	128 (30)	
TD	October 14 – 15	Tropical depression	Not specified	1008 hPa (29.77 inHg)	None	None	None	
25W (Yaning)	October 14 – 19	Tropical depression	45 km/h (28 mph)	1004 hPa (29.65 inHg)	None	None	None	
Owen	October 14 – 27	Very strong typhoon	165 km/h (103 mph)	940 hPa (27.76 inHg)	Mariana Islands	None	None	
TD	November 10 – 13	Tropical depression	Not specified	1008 hPa (29.77 inHg)	Philippines	None	None	
Pamela (Aning)	November 23 – December 8	Very strong typhoon	165 km/h (103 mph)	940 hPa (27.76 inHg)	Federated States of Micronesia, Mariana Islands, Philippines	$12,000	None	
Roger (Bidang)	December 7 – 11	Severe tropical storm	110 km/h (68 mph)	980 hPa (28.94 inHg)	Philippines	$1.69 million	None	
Season aggregates
37 systems	January 19 – December 11, 1982		230 km/h (140 mph)	895 hPa (26.43 inHg)		$2.41 billion	597 (206)	

== See also ==
- 1982 Pacific hurricane season
- 1982 Atlantic hurricane season
- 1982 North Indian Ocean cyclone season
- Australian cyclone seasons: 1981–82, 1982–83
- South Pacific cyclone seasons: 1981–82, 1982–83
- South-West Indian Ocean cyclone seasons: 1981–82, 1982–83
