= List of named storms (N) =

Storms are named for historical reasons to avoid confusion when communicating with the public, as more than one storm can exist at a time. Names are drawn in order from predetermined lists. For tropical cyclones, names are assigned when a system has one-, three-, or ten-minute winds of more than 65 km/h (40 mph). Standards, however, vary from basin to basin. For example, some tropical depressions are named in the Western Pacific, while within the Australian and Southern Pacific regions, the naming of tropical cyclones are delayed until they have gale-force winds occurring more than halfway around the storm center.

This list covers the letter N.

== Storms ==
Note: † indicates the name was retired after that usage in the respective basin

- Nada (2016) – made landfall in Tamil Nadu, near Karaikal, as a depression that killed at least 12 people.
- Nadia (1994) – a powerful tropical cyclone that struck both Madagascar and Mozambique in March 1994.
- Nadine

- 1948 – never affected land.
- 1956 – a Category 1 typhoon that stalled and then weakened, never made landfall.
- 1960 – a powerful tropical storm that affected the Philippines.
- 1962 – a powerful tropical storm that affected the southern parts of China and hit the Hindustan peninsula.
- 1968 – a powerful tropical storm that hit Taiwan.
- 1971 – a powerful category 5 typhoon that hit Taiwan and China.
- 1974 – did not make landfall.
- 1978 – stayed at sea and was the first severe tropical storm of the season it lived at least 1 week.
- 2000 – did not threaten land.
- 2012 – long-lived hurricane that churned in the open ocean.
- 2018 – never affected land.
- 2024 – short-lived storm, made landfall in Belize

- Nakri

- 2002 – brushed Taiwan and Okinawa.
- 2008 – remained out at sea.
- 2014 – affected the Ryukyu Islands and the Korean Peninsula.
- 2019 – developed west of the main Philippine Islands and made landfall in Southern Vietnam.
- 2025 – a Category 1 typhoon which passed near the coast of Japan.

- Nalgae

- 2005 – never affected land.
- 2011 – a powerful tropical cyclone that struck the Philippines, and it affected Hainan, China as a weak tropical storm.
- 2017 – never affected land.
- 2022† – a deadly tropical cyclone that caused widespread damage across the Philippines and later impacted Hong Kong and Macau.

- Namtheun

- 2004 – a powerful Category 4 typhoon that hit the coast of Japan in the form of a tropical storm.
- 2010 – a weak tropical storm that affected Taiwan and parts of China.
- 2016 – a Category 3 typhoon that only slightly affected Japan.
- 2021 – never affected land.

- Nana

- 1990 – a Category 1 hurricane that never threatened land.
- 2008 – short-lived weak tropical storm that remained at sea.
- 2020 – a Category 1 hurricane that made landfall in Belize, earliest fourteenth named storm on record.

- Nanauk (2014) – no threat to land.
- Nancy

- 1945 – tropical storm that hit South China.
- 1950 – no threat to land.
- 1954 – a category 2 typhoon that hit the northern Philippines and Vietnam also affected the southern provinces of China.
- 1958 – a Category 5 typhoon that mostly stayed at sea.
- 1961 – an extremely powerful tropical cyclone of the 1961 and one of the most intense tropical cyclones on record.
- 1964 – no threat to land.
- 1965 – no threat to land.
- 1966 (March) – a Category 2 tropical cyclone that affected Mauritius and Réunion.
- 1966 (November) – strong tropical storm that hit the Philippines.
- 1970 – a powerful category 4 typhoon that affected the Philippines.
- 1972 – a Category 3 typhoon mostly stayed at sea.
- 1976 – stayed at sea.
- 1977 – a weak Category 1 tropical cyclone that hit Queensland.
- 1979 – a weak tropical storm that hit Hainan and after made a second coast of Vietnam.
- 1982 – a destructive typhoon that moved through Vietnam and the Philippines during October 1982.
- 1986 – a Category 1 typhoon that hit Taiwan passed off the coast of China and South Korea
- 1989 – a Category 1 typhoon that had little effect on Japan and the Kuril Islands.
- 1990 – made landfall near Byron Bay.
- 2005† – the second in a series of four severe tropical cyclones to impact the Cook Islands during February 2005.

- Nando

- 2005 – a category 4 typhoon that remained on the high seas.
- 2009 – a typhoon struck China in September 2009.
- 2014 – a tropical storm that affected the Philippines, Taiwan, China, South Korea and Japan.
- 2017 – tropical depression that hit South China and Vietnam.
- 2021 – no threat to land.
- 2025† – a large and powerful Category 5 super typhoon that severely affected Luzon, Taiwan and Southeastern China.

- Nanette

- 1947 – a Category 2 typhoon impacts Taiwan and China.
- 1967 – no threat to land.
- 1971 – threatened southern Baja California but turned west before making landfall.
- 1975 – no threat to land.

- Nangka

- 2003 – tracked well east of Japan.
- 2008 – traversed the Philippines and then made its final landfall in Guangdong, China.
- 2015 – a powerful Category 4 super typhoon that affected the Mariana Islands.
- 2020 – a weak tropical cyclone which impacted Hainan and parts of Indochina, which had been affected by Tropical Storm Linfa just days earlier.
- 2026 – a weak and short-lived storm that stayed out to sea.

- Nanmadol

- 2004 – last of four consecutive tropical cyclones to strike the Philippines in 2004
- 2011 – hit the Philippines, Taiwan, and East China; second most intense tropical cyclone worldwide in 2011
- 2017 – a tropical storm that impacted southern Japan
- 2022 – an intense typhoon recently became the strongest tropical cyclone of 2022, threatened Japan.

- Naomi

- 1961 – did not make landfall.
- 1968 – a short-lived Category 1 hurricane that made landfall in Mexico's Pacific coast during the 1968 Pacific hurricane season.
- 1976 – a weak tropical storm that hit Mexico.
- 1983 – remained out at sea.
- 1993† – the first cyclone of the 1993/94 season storm moved south and strengthened into a Category 3 before making landfall Western Australia.

- Narda

- 1983 – strong tropical storm that slightly affected Hawaii.
- 1989 – did not make landfall.
- 2001 – did not make landfall.
- 2013 – did not make landfall.
- 2019 – a short-lived tropical storm that remained close to the Pacific coast of Mexico, causing flash flooding and mudslides in southwestern Mexico and the Baja California Peninsula.
- 2025 – a Category 2 hurricane that stayed out to sea

- Narelle

- 2013 – a Category 4 severe tropical cyclone that affected East Timor and Western Australia.
- 2026† – a Category 5 severe tropical cyclone that made four landfalls around Australia, but mostly affected Far North Queensland and Western Australia.

- Nargis (2008) – was an extremely destructive and deadly tropical cyclone that caused the worst natural disaster in the recorded history of Myanmar during early May 2008.
- Nari

- 2001 – an unusually long-lived category 3 typhoon which took an erratic, two week track near Taiwan during September 2001.
- 2007 – a small but powerful typhoon which struck the Korean Peninsula in early September 2007.
- 2013 – a strong and deadly tropical cyclone that first struck Luzon before striking Vietnam.
- 2019 – a weak tropical storm minor impact on Japan.
- 2025 – formed off the coast of Japan.

- Narsing

- 1965 – impacted the Philippines and China as a tropical storm.
- 1969 – very powerful typhoon, killed over a hundred people in Taiwan and eastern China.
- 1973 – crossed over Luzon, killing 27.
- 1977 – brief tropical depression.
- 1981 – brief tropical depression.
- 1985 – caused light rain in Hong Kong, avoided landfall.
- 1989 – flooded many homes across Japan from significant rainfall, leading to about $1 million in damages.
- 1993 – poorly organized tropical depression.
- 1997 – extremely violent and long-lasting typhoon that caused somewhat minor damage in the Philippines.

- Narra (2026) – weak tropical storm that affected in the Vietnam and South China.
- Nat

- 1991 – took an erratic track for over two weeks.
- 1994 – a weak tropical storm that stayed out in the open ocean.
- 2024 – a Category 2 tropical cyclone that minimal affected French Polynesia.

- Natalie

- 1964 – a weak tropical storm that made landfall near Mazatlan, Mexico.
- 1973 – a weak tropical cyclone that struck Fiji.

- Nate

- 2005 — strong category 1 hurricane that stayed out in the open ocean.
- 2011 — weak short-lived Category 1 hurricane that made landfall in the Mexican state of Veracruz.
- 2017† — made landfall in Nicaragua as a moderate tropical storm, then later, became a strong Category 1 hurricane in the Gulf of Mexico before making landfall in Louisiana.

- Nathan

- 1990 – entered the China Sea
- 1993 – crossed Japan
- 1998 – approached the Queensland coast
- 2015 – hit the Arnhem Land

- Ned (1990)† – a Category 4 severe tropical cyclone that made landfall in Western Australia.
- Neil

- 1999 – a strong tropical storm that affected Japan and South Korea.
- 2019 – a Category 1 tropical cyclone no structural damage was reported from the storm.

- Nell

- 1990 – hit southeast Asia.
- 1993 – hit the Philippines.

- Nelly

- 1949 – struck central Taiwan.
- 1971 – a Category 1 tropical cyclone that affected Mozambique and South Africa.

- Nelson

- 1983 – the second tropical cyclone to strike the Philippines within a week in March 1982.
- 1985 – the worst tropical cyclone to affect Southern China in 16 years.
- 1988 – a Category 5 typhoon mostly stayed at sea.
- 2007 – a Category 2 tropical cyclone that affected Northern Territory and Queensland.

- Neneng

- 1963 – struck Hong Kong killing 3 people.
- 1967 – did not make landfall.
- 1971 – traversed the Philippines and made landfall near the demilitarized zone between North and South Vietnam as a Category 4-equivalent typhoon.
- 1975 – did not affect land.
- 1979 – struck China and South Korea.
- 1983 – short-lived tropical depression that was only recognized by PAGASA and the Hong Kong Observatory.
- 1987 – affected the Philippines, Taiwan, and China during September 1987.
- 1991 – a mid-season typhoon that struck Japan during 1991.
- 1995 – powerful typhoon that stayed at sea.
- 1999 – struck China and Hong Kong.
- 2006 – led to 33 people dead or missing after becoming an extratropical low.
- 2014 – a powerful tropical cyclone which affected Japan in early October 2014.
- 2018 – a weak tropical storm that caused flooding in the far northern regions of the Philippines and Southern China.
- 2022 – a typhoon which recently affected northern Philippines, Taiwan and Vietnam.
- 2026 — a weak system that lingered near Taiwan and Ryukyu Islands.

- Neoguri

- 2008 – the earliest tropical cyclone on record to strike China.
- 2014 – A Category 5 storm that eventually made landfall in Japan and Korea.
- 2019 – did not affect land.
- 2025 – a long-lived Category 4 typhoon that churned in the open ocean.

- Nepartak

- 2003 – a modest tropical cyclone that struck the central Philippines and the southern China island of Hainan in November 2003.
- 2009 – did not affect land.
- 2016 – a very powerful storm which impacted Taiwan and devastated East China.
- 2021 - a weak storm which affected Japan.

- Nesat

- 2005 – approached Japan.
- 2011 – the most powerful tropical cyclone to directly impact China since 2005.
- 2017 – a strong tropical cyclone that impacted Taiwan and Fujian, China.
- 2022 — a typhoon which recently affected northern Philippines, Taiwan and Vietnam.

- Nestor

- 1997 – a Category 5 super typhoon that affected the Northern Mariana Islands.
- 2019 – a short lived tropical storm that affected the Southeastern United States.

- Neville

- 1992 – a powerful tropical cyclone hit the Northern Territory minor damage.
- 2010 – never threatened land.
- 2024 – a Category 4 severe tropical cyclone passed north of the Cocos Islands.

- Newton

- 1980 – a weak tropical storm that dissipated before making landfall in Mexico.
- 1986 – one of the few tropical cyclones that were intercepted by Hurricane Hunter flights during the active 1986 it made landfall on the Baja California Peninsula in September of that year, causing minor damage.
- 1992 – did not affect land.
- 2016 – a Category 1 hurricane that made landfall on the Baja California peninsula.
- 2022 – formed near southwestern Mexico and then moved out to sea, caused minor effects on land.

- Nicholas

- 1985 – severe tropical cyclone that did not threaten land.
- 1996 — made landfall west of Derby, Australia.
- 2003 – long-lived and erratic tropical storm.
- 2008 – made landfall north of Carnarvon, Australia.
- 2021 – Category 1 hurricane that made landfall near Sargent, Texas, bringing heavy rainfall and storm surge to parts of the U.S. Gulf Coast.

- Nichole (1998) – a weak short-lived tropical storm which affected western Taiwan and southeastern China, causing minimal damage.
- Nicole

- 1998 – a late season storm which was only briefly a hurricane west of the Azores and never approached land.
- 2004 – a short-lived storm that formed from a low-pressure area near Bermuda and headed towards Nova Scotia.
- 2010 – a weak tropical storm that affected Cuba and brought heavy flooding to Jamaica; later contributed to the formation of a large extra-tropical storm over the East Coast of the United States.
- 2016 – a long-lived Category 4 hurricane that made landfall on Bermuda.
- 2022 – Category 1 hurricane which made landfall in The Bahamas and Florida.

- Nida

- 2004 – a Category 5 super typhoon that formed southeast of the Philippines in mid-May that reached peak strength not far from the east-central Philippines and finally became extratropical east of Japan.
- 2008 – a powerful Category 5 super typhoon that formed within a monsoon trough 545 miles (880 km) southeast of Guam in late November and reached 10-minute peak winds of 130 mph (215 km/h)
- 2016 – impacted the Philippines and South China as a severe tropical storm.
- 2021 – did not affect land.

- Nigel

- 1985† – a Category 3 severe tropical cyclone that affected Vanuatu and Fiji.
- 2023 – a Category 2 hurricane that stayed at sea.

- Nika

- 2020 – a weak tropical cyclone which impacted Hainan and parts of Indochina.
- 2024† – a Category 1 typhoon that made landfall in the Philippines.

- Nilam (2012) – was the deadliest tropical cyclone to directly affect South India since Cyclone Jal in 2010.
- Nilofar (2014) – was at the time, the third-strongest cyclone in the Arabian Sea.
- Nina

- 1953 – a powerful category 4 typhoon that hit China.
- 1957 – the final tropical storm and hurricane of the 1957 and the last storm to form during the active Central Pacific hurricane season this year.
- 1960 – never made landfall.
- 1963 – did not affect land.
- 1966 – was a Category 1 tropical cyclone.
- 1968 – crossed the Philippines.
- 1972 – did not affect land.
- 1975 – struck Taiwan. Contributed to the collapse of the Banqiao Dam in central China, killing around 200,000.
- 1978 – 59 people died and more than 500,000 were in evacuation centers in the Philippines.
- 1981 – a weak tropical storm that affected Taiwan and hit China.
- 1984 – did not affect land.
- 1987 – the most intense typhoon to strike the Philippines since Typhoon Irma in 1981.
- 1992 – did not affect land.
- 1993† – a significant tropical cyclone, which impacted six island nations and caused several deaths.
- 1995 – a weak tropical storm hit the Philippines and China.
- 2003 – a moderate tropical cyclone that caused a swath of damage stretching from the Philippines to Vietnam in August 2003.
- 2004 – the fourth-costliest typhoon on record.
- 2008 – a powerful cyclone that caused widespread destruction along its path in September 2008.
- 2012 – a Category 3 typhoon mostly stayed at sea.
- 2016† – a late-season powerful storm that affected the Philippines.

- Ningning

- 1988 – had no significant effects on land.
- 1992 – a Category 5 super typhoon that curved away from the Philippines.
- 1996 – struck the Philippines and dissipated offshore Vietnam.
- 2000 – brushed Luzon.

- Niran (2021) – a Category 5 tropical cyclone which affected Queensland and New Caledonia.
- Nisarga (2020) – was the strongest tropical cyclone to strike the Indian state of Maharashtra in the month of June since 1891.
- Nisha

- 1983 – formed and existed at the same time as Severe Tropical Cyclone Oscar.
- 1993 – remained away from highly populated islands.
- 2008 – a fairly weak but catastrophic tropical cyclone that struck Sri Lanka, and India which killed over 200.
- 2010 – weak storm that remained away from highly populated islands.

- Nivar (2020) – a tropical cyclone which brought severe impacts to portions of Tamil Nadu and Andhra Pradesh in late November 2020.
- Nock-ten

- 2004 – struck Taiwan.
- 2011 – Struck the Philippines and Vietnam killing 119 people and causing damage worth US$126 million.
- 2016† – a very powerful late-season Category 5 super typhoon that threatened the Philippines.

- Noel

- 1995 – Category 1 hurricane that remained far from land.
- 2001 – Category 1 hurricane that never threatened land.
- 2007† – Category 1 hurricane that affected parts of the Greater Antilles, The Bahamas, the Eastern United States and Atlantic Canada, killing 169 people and causing 580 million (2007 USD) in damage.

- Noguri (2002) – a Category 2 typhoon that affected Japan.
- Nokaen (2026) – a weak tropical storm that closely passed the Philippines.
- Nolo (2026) – a powerful, long-lived, and long-tracked tropical cyclone that became the fifth-wettest tropical cyclone on record to affect the U.S. state of Hawaii.
- Nona

- 1952 – a Category 1 typhoon that struck the Philippines and southern China.
- 1994 – a short-lived tropical storm that did not affect land.
- 2015† – a Category 4 typhoon that made multiple landfalls in the Philippines.

- Nongfa (2025) – a tropical storm that affected Philippines and that made landfall in Vietnam.
- Nonoy

- 2007 – formed in the open ocean without affecting land.
- 2011 – a weak tropical storm that passed through the Ryukyu Islands.

- Nora

- 1945 – did not affect land.
- 1951 – a Category 3 typhoon hits Philippines, South China and Vietnam.
- 1955 – a Category 2 typhoon slightly touches Japan.
- 1959 – tropical storm that hit the Philippines and China.
- 1962 – a Category 1 typhoon passed off the coast of China where it hit the Korean Peninsula and Japan.
- 1964 – tropical storm that hit the Philippines.
- 1967 – a Category 1 typhoon hit the Taiwan and China.
- 1970 - remnants contributed to the formation of the Bhola Cyclone.
- 1973 – one of the most intense tropical cyclones ever recorded.
- 1976 – struck the central Philippines.
- 1985 – not a threat to land.
- 1991 – a Category 2 hurricane that dissipated before landfall.
- 1997 – a powerful Category 4 hurricane that made landfall in Baja California, and moved into Arizona.
- 2003 – a Category 2 hurricane that became the strongest storm of the season, made landfall as a tropical depression.
- 2009 – no threat to land.
- 2015 – approached Hawaii but dissipated before landfall.
- 2018 – made landfall in Far North Queensland, causing more than US$25 million in damages and economic losses.
- 2021 – a large Category 1 hurricane that made landfall in the Mexican state of Jalisco.

- Norbert

- 1984 – took an erratic track several hundred miles south of Baja California, making landfall there.
- 1990 – stayed at sea.
- 2008 – struck Baja California.
- 2014 – a Category 3 that affected Western Mexico and the Baja California Peninsula.
- 2020 – moderate tropical storm that stayed at sea.
- 2026 – moderate tropical storm that stayed at sea.

- Norma

- 1948 – formed in the open ocean without affecting land.
- 1964 – a tropical cyclone that mostly stayed at sea.
- 1970 – its remnants fueled the Labor Day Storm of 1970, causing severe floods and damage in the U.S. state of Arizona.
- 1974 – a Category 1 hurricane that made landfall west of Acapulco, Mexico.
- 1981 – a Category 3 hurricane that caused minor damage in Mexico, though its remnants caused severe flooding in Texas and Oklahoma.
- 1987 – a Category 1 hurricane that dissipated just before landfall, caused heavy rainfall in California as a remnant low.
- 1993 – moderate tropical storm that stayed at sea.
- 2005 – a strong tropical storm that also stayed in the open ocean.
- 2017 – a Category 1 hurricane that briefly threatened land but moved out to sea.
- 2023 – a Category 4 hurricane that caused minor damage in Baja California Sur and three deaths in Sinaloa.

- Norman

- 1977 – a Category 2 tropical cyclone that minimal affected Vanuatu.
- 1978 – a Category 4 hurricane that struck California as a tropical depression.
- 1982 – a Category 2 hurricane that turned toward Baja California.
- 1994 – weak, short-lived tropical storm.
- 2000 (March) – no direct impact on Western Australia.
- 2000 (September) – struck Mexico.
- 2006 – near southwestern Mexico.
- 2012 – weak and short lived, it also struck Mexico.
- 2018 – powerful Category 4 hurricane that moved into the Central Pacific.

- Norming

- 1966 – was not recognized by the JTWC.
- 1970 – struck Taiwan and China.
- 1974 – had no significant effects on land.
- 1978 – did not make landfall.
- 1982 – a long lived Category 2 typhoon that caused 43 deaths and $9.6 million (1982 USD) in damages.
- 1986 – made landfall in Taiwan, causing 13 fatalities during its lifetime.
- 1990 – a Category 5 super typhoon that weakened before striking Japan; flooding and landslides caused 32 deaths.
- 1994 – brushed the Philippines.
- 1998 – struck both the Philippines and Vietnam, leaving 63 dead and 36 missing.

- Norris

- 1980 – struck Taiwan.
- 1983 – short-lived tropical storm which stayed at sea.
- 1986 – late-season typhoon which spanned two calendar years and struck the Philippines.

- Noru

- 2004 – stayed at sea.
- 2011 – merged with the extratropical remnants of Talas.
- 2017 – impacted Japan and is tied as the second longest lasting northwest Pacific tropical cyclone on record.
- 2022† – a rapidly intensifying Category 5-equivalent typhoon that caused destructive impacts in the Philippines and Vietnam.

- Noul

- 2007 – Affected Vietnam
- 2015 – a Category 5 typhoon that caused minimal damage in the Philippines.
- 2020 – a tropical storm that caused minor damage in Vietnam.
- 2026 – a Category 2 typhoon that struck Luzon and Guangdong.

- Numa (2017) – a rare Mediterranean tropical-like cyclone.
- Nuri

- 2008 – affected the Philippines, Hong Kong and China during August 2008.
- 2014 – the third most intense tropical cyclone in 2014.
- 2020 – made landfall in the Philippines and affected Southern China.
- 2026 – a weak and short-lived storm that stayed out to sea

- Nyatoh (2021) – a Category 4 typhoon, stayed at sea.

== See also ==
- Tropical cyclone
- Tropical cyclone naming
- European windstorm names
- Atlantic hurricane season
- List of Pacific hurricane seasons
- South Atlantic tropical cyclone
