= List of storms named Norming =

The name Norming has been used to name nine tropical cyclones in the Philippine Area of Responsibility by the PAGASA and its predecessor, the Philippine Weather Bureau.

- Tropical Depression Norming (1966) – was not recognized by the JTWC.
- Tropical Storm Fran (1970) (T7015, 16W, Norming) – struck Taiwan and China.
- Tropical Storm Nadine (1974) (T7417, 17W, Norming) – had no significant effects on land.
- Tropical Storm Gloria (1978) (T7816, 17W, Norming) – did not make landfall.
- Typhoon Faye (1982) (T8215, 15W, Norming) – a long lived Category 2 typhoon that caused 43 deaths and $9.6 million (1982 USD) in damages.
- Typhoon Abby (1986) (T8616, 13W, Norming) – made landfall in Taiwan, causing 13 fatalities during its lifetime.
- Typhoon Flo (1990) (T9019, 20W, Norming) – a Category 5 super typhoon that weakened before striking Japan; flooding and landslides caused 32 deaths.
- Tropical Storm Yunya (1994) (T9409, 11W, Norming) – brushed the Philippines.
- Typhoon Faith (1998) (T9815, 24W, Norming) – struck both the Philippines and Vietnam, leaving 63 dead and 36 missing.

After the 2000 Pacific typhoon season, the PAGASA revised their naming lists and the name Norming was excluded.
