= Noru =

Noru may refer to:

- Noru, several named storms
- Non-chan Kumo ni Noru, 1955 Japanese film
- NŌRU, an ancient Tamil term for 100
