= Nando =

Nando may refer to:

== People ==
- Nando (name), a male given name or nickname (short for Fernando, Ferdinando, etc.)
- Fernando da Piedade Dias dos Santos (born 1950), known as Nandó, Angolan politician and former Prime Minister of Angola
- Nando (footballer, born May 1967), Spanish footballer Fernando Martínez Perales
- Nando (footballer, born October 1967), Spanish footballer Fernando Muñoz García
- Nando (footballer, born 1990), Portuguese footballer Fernando Henrique Quintela Cavalcante
- Nando (Mozambican footballer) (1982–2007), Mozambican footballer Fernando Paulo Matola
- Fernando Nando García (born 1994), Spanish footballer commonly known as Nando
- Fernando Nando Gómez (born 1984), Spanish footballer commonly known as Nando
- Fernando Nando González (1921–1988), Spanish footballer better known as Nando
- Nando (futsal player) (born 1987), Brazilian futsal player
- Nando, former lead singer of Los Super Reyes, a Mexican-American cumbia group
- Kunio Nando (1916–2011), Japanese speed skater and coach

== Other uses ==
- Nando (architecture), a feature of Japanese architecture
- Nando (media company), an American internet news service and Internet service provider
- Nando, Nigeria, a town in Anambra State
- Nando Region, Burkina Faso, one of the country's 17 regions
- Typhoon Nando (disambiguation), a designation assigned by the Philippine Atmospheric, Geophysical and Astronomical Services Administration
- Nando, singular form of Nandor (Middle-earth), a term for a group of Elves in J. R. R. Tolkien's fictional Middle-earth
- Nando, a European Union database on Notified Bodies

== See also ==
- Nando's, a South African casual dining restaurant chain
- Nando's Coffee House, a coffee house based in London (17th and 18th centuries)
