= List of storms named Nancy =

The name Nancy has been used for a total of nineteen tropical cyclones worldwide: fourteen in the Western Pacific Ocean, one in the Southwest Indian Ocean and four in the Southwestern Pacific Ocean.

== Western Pacific ==
- Tropical Storm Nancy (1945)
- Tropical Storm Nancy (1950) (Japan Meteorological Agency analyzed it as a tropical depression, not as a tropical storm.)
- Typhoon Nancy (1954) (T5416)
- Typhoon Nancy (1958) (T5828)
- Typhoon Nancy (1961) – (T6118, 52W) struck Japan. Known as 2nd Muroto Typhoon.
- Tropical Storm Nancy (1964) (21W, Japan Meteorological Agency analyzed it as a tropical depression.)
- Tropical Storm Nancy (1966) (T6633, 36W, Uding)
- Typhoon Nancy (1970) (T7001, 01W, Atang)
- Typhoon Nancy (1972) (T7225, 27W)
- Tropical Storm Nancy (1976) (T7604, 04W)
- Tropical Storm Nancy (1979) (T7915, 18W)
- Typhoon Nancy (1982) (T8222, 24W, Weling) – struck Philippines.
- Typhoon Nancy (1986) (T8605, 05W) – struck Taiwan.
- Typhoon Nancy (1989) (T8914, 17W)

== Southwest Indian Ocean ==
- Cyclone Nancy (1965)

== Southwest Pacific Ocean ==
- Cyclone Nancy (1966)
- Cyclone Nancy (1977)
- Cyclone Nancy (1990) – made landfall near Byron Bay.
- Cyclone Nancy (2005) – a Category 4 tropical cyclone whose damage warranted retirement of the name.
