= List of storms named Noel =

The name Noel was used for three tropical cyclones in the Atlantic Ocean.

- Hurricane Noel (1995) – Category 1 hurricane that remained far from land.
- Hurricane Noel (2001) – Category 1 hurricane that never threatened land.
- Hurricane Noel (2007) – Category 1 hurricane that affected parts of the Greater Antilles, The Bahamas, the Eastern United States and Atlantic Canada, killing 169 people and causing 580 million (2007 USD) in damage.

The name Noel was retired after the 2007 hurricane season, and was replaced by Nestor for the 2013 season.
