= List of storms named Nate =

The name Nate was used for three tropical cyclones in the Atlantic Ocean:

- Hurricane Nate (2005) – strong Category 1 hurricane that stayed out at sea
- Hurricane Nate (2011) – weak short-lived Category 1 hurricane that made landfall in Veracruz
- Hurricane Nate (2017) – made landfall in Nicaragua as a moderate tropical storm, then later, became a strong Category 1 hurricane in the Gulf of Mexico before making landfall in Louisiana

After the 2017 season, the name Nate was retired from future use due to the destruction and casualties it caused. It was replaced with Nigel for the 2023 season.

== See also ==
- Cyclone Nute (1997) – a South Pacific Ocean tropical cyclone with a similar name
