= Hurricane Nate (2011) =

Category 1 Atlantic hurricane in 2011

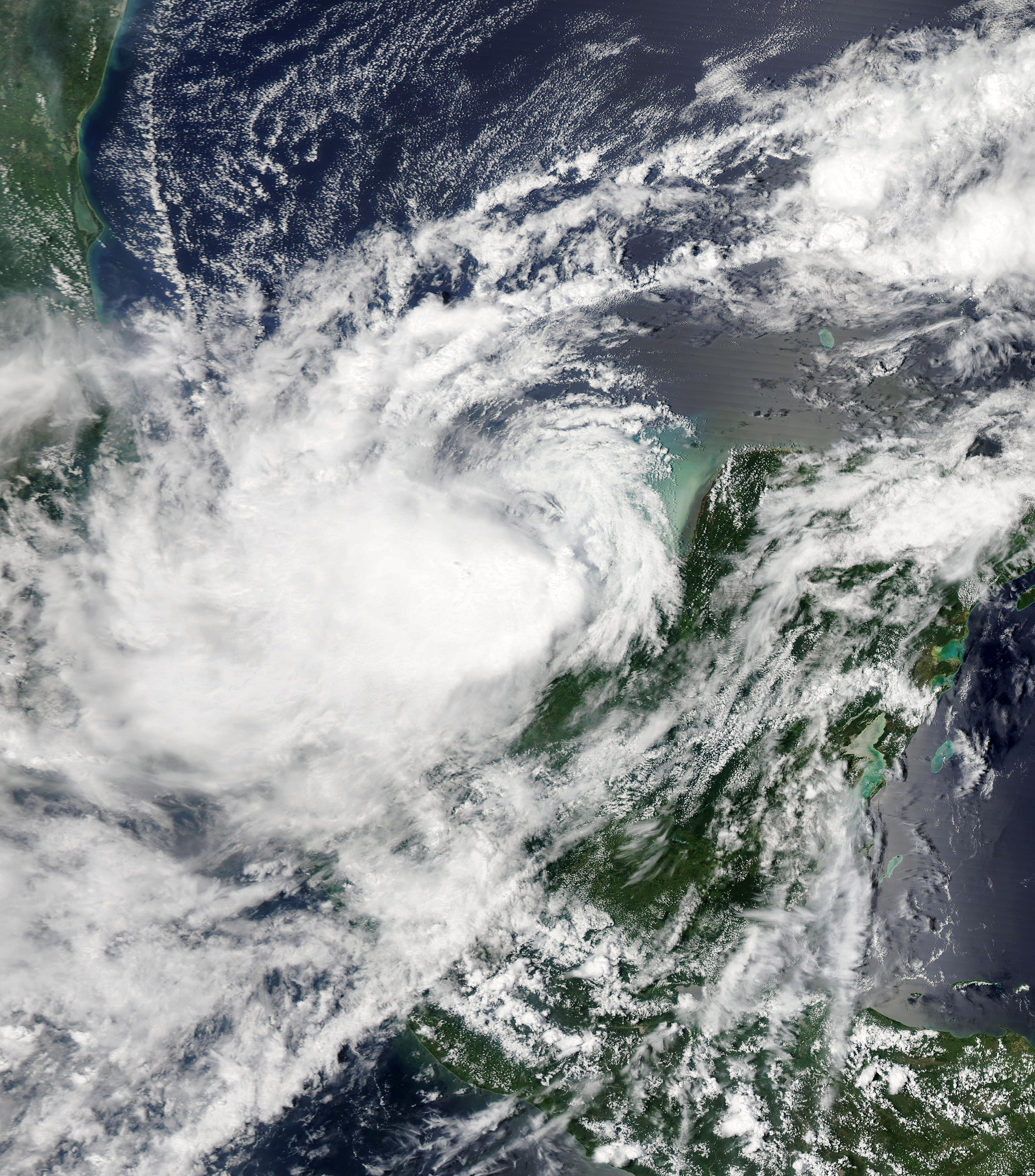
- Hurricane Nate at peak intensity to the west of the Yucatán Peninsula on September 8

Meteorological history
- Formed: September 7, 2011
- Remnant low: September 11
- Dissipated: September 12, 2011

Category 1 hurricane
- 1-minute sustained (SSHWS/NWS)
- Highest winds: 75 mph (120 km/h)
- Lowest pressure: 994 mbar (hPa); 29.35 inHg

Overall effects
- Fatalities: 4 direct, 1 indirect
- Damage: Minimal
- Areas affected: Mexico
- IBTrACS
- Part of the 2011 Atlantic hurricane season

Hurricane Nate was a hurricane that caused minor damage in southeastern Mexico in mid-September 2011. The fourteenth named storm and fourth hurricane of the 2011 Atlantic hurricane season, Nate originated from a frontal trough in the Bay of Campeche on September 7. Within a weak steering environment, the storm meandered southwestward while gradually gaining strength. Though classified as a tropical storm operationally, data during a post-season review indicated that Nate briefly attained Category 1 hurricane status on the Saffir–Simpson hurricane wind scale on September 8. As a result of its slow motion, the storm caused significant upwelling, leading to a marked decrease in convection, and weakening accordingly. On September 11, Nate moved ashore Mexico as a tropical storm, producing several inches of rainfall and damaging several hundred structures. Ten oil rig workers went missing; seven were rescued, but one died of an unknown cause, and three other bodies were later recovered. In Veracruz, a boy was killed after being struck by lightning.

== Meteorological history ==
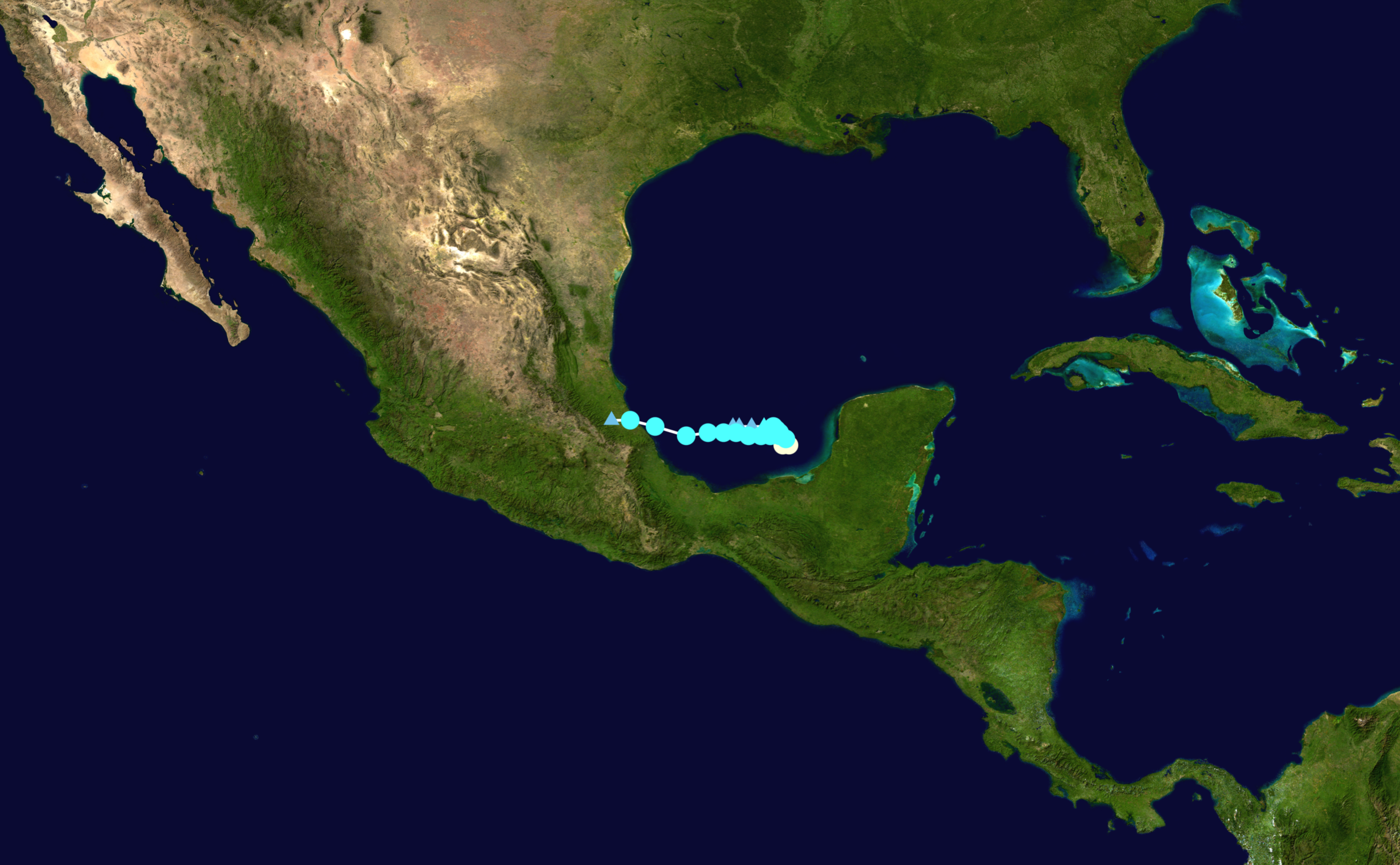
Map plotting the storm's track and intensity, according to the Saffir–Simpson scale Map key Saffir–Simpson scale Tropical depression (≤38 mph, ≤62 km/h) Tropical storm (39–73 mph, 63–118 km/h) Category 1 (74–95 mph, 119–153 km/h) Category 2 (96–110 mph, 154–177 km/h) Category 3 (111–129 mph, 178–208 km/h) Category 4 (130–156 mph, 209–251 km/h) Category 5 (≥157 mph, ≥252 km/h) Unknown Storm type Tropical cyclone Subtropical cyclone Extratropical cyclone, remnant low, tropical disturbance, or monsoon depression

On September 5, a frontal trough, the same responsible for the extratropical transition of Tropical Storm Lee, passed through the western Gulf of Mexico before stalling in the central Gulf of Mexico and Bay of Campeche. At the tail-end of the trough, increased shower and thunderstorm activity associated with a developing low-pressure area prompted the National Hurricane Center (NHC) to begin monitoring the disturbance for tropical cyclone formation the next day. The low separated from the front early on September 7, but convection was too disorganized for classification at the time. By 1800 UTC, however, a curved band developed in the western semicircle of the circulation. In accordance with satellite imagery, surface observations from land and oil rigs, and data from a reconnaissance aircraft, the disturbance was upgraded to Tropical Storm Nate, positioned roughly 160 mi (260 km) north of Villahermosa, Mexico.

Within a weak steering environment between a mid-level ridge over northern Mexico and a mid-level ridge over the northern Caribbean Sea, Nate drifted slowly southwestward initially. Though an abundance of dry air was expected to limit a rapid rate of intensification, warm sea surface temperatures and light to moderate wind shear allowed for gradual strengthening. Operationally, the system attained its peak intensity with maximum sustained winds of 70 mph (110 km/h) and a minimum barometric pressure of 994 mb (29.35 inHg) on September 8. However, as part of its post-season routine, the NHC received data from an offshore oil rig in the southeastern quadrant of the system that yielded maximum sustained surface winds of 77 mph (124 km/h); as a result, Nate was re-designated as a Category 1 hurricane on the Saffir–Simpson hurricane wind scale while centered approximately 80 mi (130 km) north-northwest of Ciudad del Carmen, Mexico. Following peak intensity, the storm's broad wind field and slow forward motion led to significant ocean upwelling. With cooler sea surface temperatures and low ocean heat content, the coverage of deep convection decreased and Nate weakened to a tropical storm at 0600 UTC on September 9.

Tropical Storm Nate approaching Mexico with a nearly convection-free circulation on September 10

While accelerating west-northwest and eventually westward in response to an eastward shift in the ridge over Mexico, Nate moved away from cooler ocean temperatures, briefly allowing it to gain strength on September 10. By the next day, however, increasingly dry, low- to mid-level air wrapped into the circulation, causing associated convection to collapse. At 1600 UTC on September 11, the system made landfall near Barra de Tecolutla, Mexico, with winds of 45 mph (75 km/h). The rugged terrain of Mexico caused Nate to rapidly weaken once inland, and the cyclone degenerated into a remnant low by 0000 UTC on September 12, about 20 mi (30 km) west of Poza Rica, Mexico. The circulation dissipated six hours later, at 1200 UTC on September 12.

== Preparations and impact ==
Following Nate's declaration as a tropical cyclone, the Government of Mexico issued a tropical storm warning stretching from Chilitepec to Celestún, noting that tropical storm conditions were likely within 12 hours. Early on September 8, a tropical storm watch was issued from Celestún to Progreso. A day later, a tropical storm watches were issued from La Cruz to Tampico and Veracruz to Punta El Lagarto. A hurricane watch was issued from Tampico to Veracruz, and three hours later, all tropical storm warnings were discontinued. On September 10, the tropical storm watch stretching from Veracruz to Punta El Lagarto was discontinued, and a tropical storm warning was issued from Tampico to Punta El Lagarto. By 1500 UTC, all tropical storm watches were discontinued, and at 2100 UTC, the tropical storm warning area was modified to Tampico to Tuxpan. At this time, the hurricane watch area was modified to Tampico to Tuxpan, and a hurricane warning was issued from Tampico to Veracruz. The following day, this hurricane warning was changed to a tropical storm warning following Nate's weakening trend. All hurricane watches were discontinued, and during the afternoon hours, all tropical storm warnings were discontinued.

On September 7, the Dos Bocas and Cayo Arcas ports, Mexico's two main crude oil export ports, closed in preparation for the storm. Ten contractors for Geokinetics were forced to abandon their lifeboat after evacuating the Trinity II rig. Seven of the ten men were rescued; however, one later died, and the bodies of the three other men were recovered. The body of the tenth man, who had remained listed as "missing" for several days, was recovered by the Mexican Navy on September 14. Throughout Veracruz, 839 homes were damaged by the storm. In the southern sections of the state, Nate produced several inches of rainfall. A child was killed in Pánuco when a lightning-struck tree fell on his home.

== See also ==
- Tropical cyclones in 2011
- Other tropical cyclones named Nate
- List of Category 1 Atlantic hurricanes
- Hurricane Lorenzo (2007)
