= List of storms named Nat =

The name Nat has been used for three tropical cyclones worldwide: two in the West Pacific Ocean and one in the South Pacific Ocean.

In the West Pacific:

- Typhoon Nat (1991; T9120, 22W, Oniang) – took an erratic track for over two weeks.
- Tropical Storm Nat (1994) (T9426, 27W) – a weak tropical storm that stayed out in the open ocean.

In the South Pacific:

- Cyclone Nat (2024) – a Category 2 tropical cyclone that minimally affected French Polynesia.
