= List of storms named Nonoy =

The name Nonoy has been used for two tropical cyclones in the Philippine Area of Responsibility by PAGASA in the Western Pacific Ocean.

- Tropical Depression Nonoy (2007) (25W, Nonoy) – did not make landfall.
- Tropical Storm Kulap (2011) (T1114, 17W, Nonoy) – a weak tropical storm that passed through the Ryukyu Islands.

PAGASA also retired the name Nonoy because it sounded similar to the name of President “Noynoy” Aquino at that time to avoid confusion.
