= List of storms named Nando =

The name Nando has been used for six tropical cyclones in the Philippine Area of Responsibility by PAGASA in the Western Pacific Ocean. It replaced the name Nanang after it was retired following the 2001 Pacific typhoon season.

- Typhoon Kirogi (2005) (T0520, 21W, Nando) – strong typhoon that didn't affect land
- Typhoon Koppu (2009) (T0915, 16W, Nando) – struck China
- Severe Tropical Storm Kong-rey (2013) (T1315, 14W, Nando) – struck Japan
- Tropical Depression 22W (2017) (22W, Nando) – struck Hainan
- Tropical Depression Nando (2021) – only recognized by PAGASA
- Typhoon Ragasa (2025) (T2518, 24W, Nando) – a large and powerful Category 5 super typhoon that severely affected Luzon, Taiwan and Southeastern China.

The name Nando was retired following the 2025 season and was replaced with Nilad, meaning a type of shrub (Scyphiphora hydrophylacea) in Tagalog, for the 2029 season.
