= List of storms named Nelly =

The name Nelly, and the alternate spelling Nellie, has been used for three tropical cyclones worldwide.

In the Western Pacific Ocean:

- Typhoon Nelly (1949) (T4913) – struck central Taiwan.

In the Australian region:

- Cyclone Nellie (1973)

In the Southwest Indian Ocean:

- Cyclone Nelly (1971)

== See also ==
- Hurricane Nele, a similar name used once in the Central Pacific.
