= List of storms named Nanette =

The name Nanette has been used for three tropical cyclones in the Eastern Pacific Ocean.

- Tropical Storm Nanette (1967)
- Hurricane Nanette (1971)
- Tropical Storm Nanette (1975)

The name Nanette has also been used for one tropical cyclone in the Western Pacific Ocean.

- Typhoon Nanette (1947) (T4713)
