= List of storms named Norris =

The name Norris has been used for three tropical cyclones worldwide, all in the Western Pacific Ocean:

- Typhoon Norris (1980) (T8012, 13W, Reming) – struck Taiwan.
- Tropical Storm Norris (1983) (T8318, 19W) – short-lived tropical storm which stayed at sea.
- Typhoon Norris (1986) (T8629, 26W, Bidang) – late-season typhoon which spanned two calendar years and struck the Philippines.
