= List of storms named Natalie =

The name Natalie has been used for two tropical cyclones worldwide: one in the East Pacific Ocean and one in the South Pacific Ocean.

In the East Pacific:

- Tropical Storm Natalie (1964) – a weak tropical storm that made landfall near Mazatlan, Mexico.

In the South Pacific:

- Cyclone Natalie (1973) – a weak tropical cyclone that struck Fiji.
