= List of storms named Nell =

The name Nell has been used for two tropical cyclones in the West Pacific Ocean:

- Tropical Storm Nell (1990) (T9026, 28W)
- Tropical Storm Nell (1993) (T9328, 37W, Puring)
