= Typhoon Faith =

Pacific typhoon in 1998

Typhoon Faith (Norming)
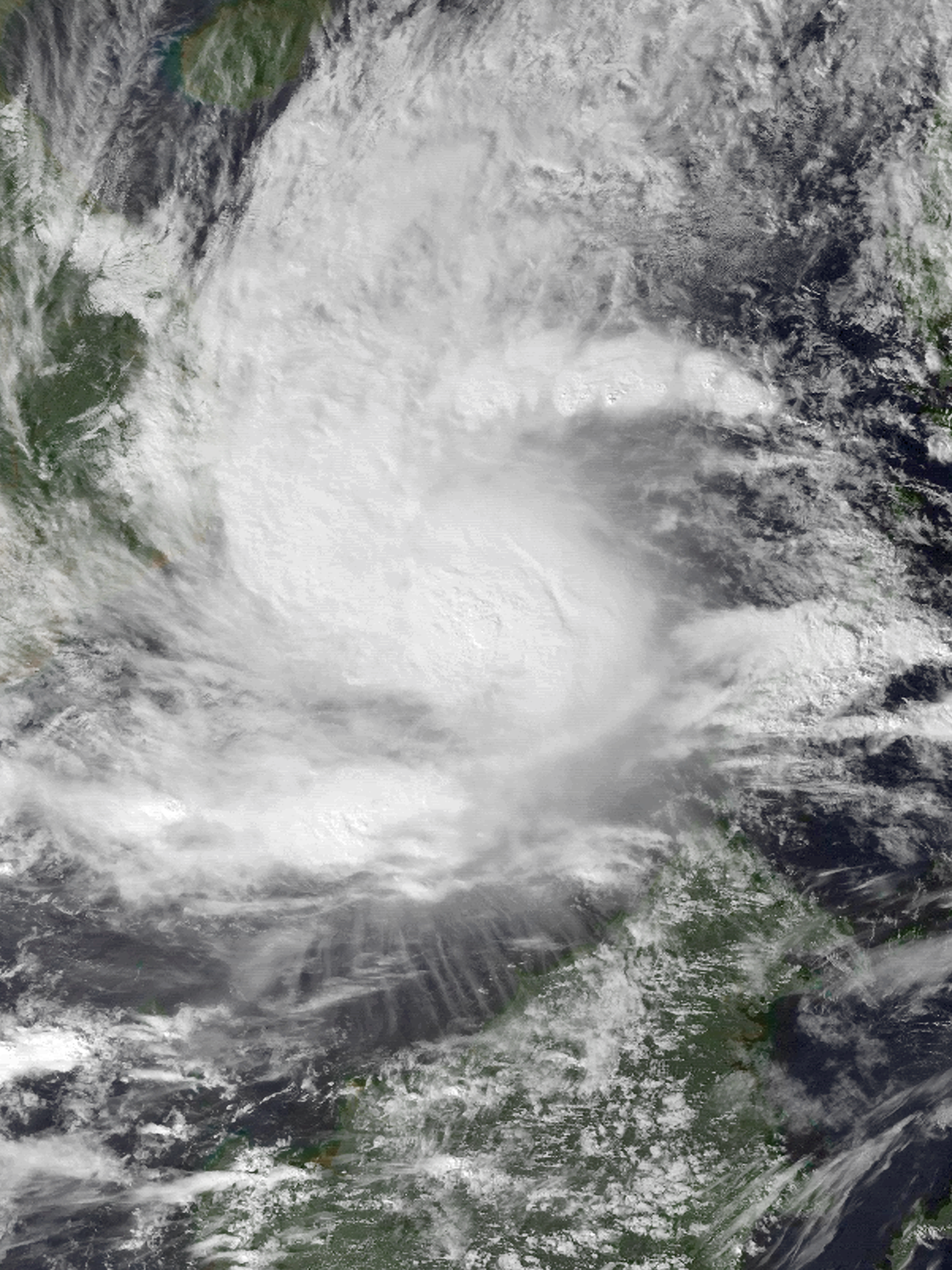
- Typhoon Faith at peak intensity

Meteorological history
- Formed: December 8, 1998
- Dissipated: December 14, 1998

Typhoon
- 10-minute sustained (JMA)
- Highest winds: 120 km/h (75 mph)
- Lowest pressure: 970 hPa (mbar); 28.64 inHg

Category 2-equivalent typhoon
- 1-minute sustained (SSHWS/JTWC)
- Highest winds: 165 km/h (105 mph)

Overall effects
- Fatalities: 66 confirmed
- Missing: 36
- Damage: $45.9 million (1998 USD)
- Areas affected: Philippines, Vietnam, Laos, Cambodia
- IBTrACS
- Part of the 1998 Pacific typhoon season

Typhoon Faith, known in the Philippines as Typhoon Norming, struck both the Philippines and Vietnam during December 1998. A tropical disturbance developed within the vicinity of the western Caroline Islands during early December. At midday on December 8, the system developed into a tropical depression. Tracking northwest at a brisk pace, the depression gradually intensified, and was upgraded into a tropical storm at noon on December 9. Quickly intensifying, Faith turned to the west-northwest, and after tracking near Samar Island on the evening of December 10, Faith attained typhoon intensity. After clipping the northern tip of Palawan Island, the typhoon entered the South China Sea at peak intensity. Across the Philippines, 33 people were killed, with 30 others wounded and 36 others listed missing. A total of 6,423 homes were damaged and 3,234 houses were destroyed, leaving more than 20,000 homeless. Damage was estimated at $25.9 million, with $6.82 million from crops, $15.9 million from public infrastructure, and $3.37 million from private infrastructure.

The typhoon tracked westward before tracking west-southwest, only to decelerate to the west-northwest. Increased wind shear took toll on the storm and caused a weakening trend. On December 12, Faith lost typhoon intensity, and two days later, Faith weakened into a tropical depression. After striking Vietnam, the depression rapidly dissipated over land. At least 38 people were killed in Vietnam with over 10,000 evacuated due to flooding in low-lying areas. Damage in Vietnam exceeded $20 million.

== Meteorological history ==
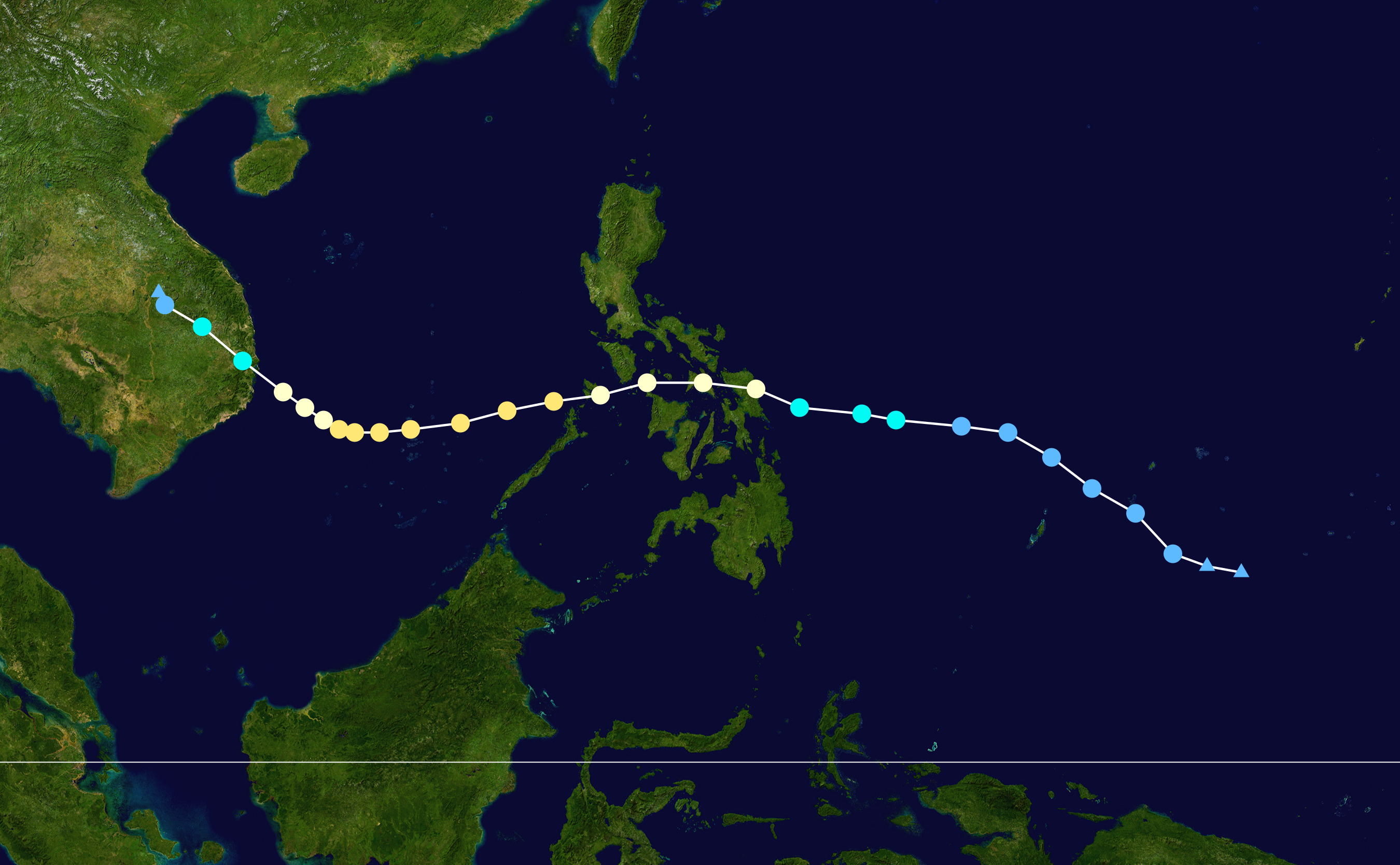
Map plotting the storm's track and intensity, according to the Saffir–Simpson scale Map key Saffir–Simpson scale Tropical depression (≤38 mph, ≤62 km/h) Tropical storm (39–73 mph, 63–118 km/h) Category 1 (74–95 mph, 119–153 km/h) Category 2 (96–110 mph, 154–177 km/h) Category 3 (111–129 mph, 178–208 km/h) Category 4 (130–156 mph, 209–251 km/h) Category 5 (≥157 mph, ≥252 km/h) Unknown Storm type Tropical cyclone Subtropical cyclone Extratropical cyclone, remnant low, tropical disturbance, or monsoon depression

On December 8, 1998, the Joint Typhoon Warning Center (JTWC) issued a Tropical Cyclone Formation Alert for a tropical disturbance located within the vicinity of the western Caroline Islands. At 06:00 UTC, the JTWC upgraded the system, which was located 565 km (350 mi) east-southeast of Palau, into a tropical depression, with the JMA following suit six hours later. (Note: The Japan Meteorological Agency is the official Regional Specialized Meteorological Center for the western Pacific Ocean.) Initially, the depression moved fairly quickly on a northwesterly course in response to a weak trough to its north, while also slowly strengthening and passing about 185 km (115 mi) north of Palau. At 00:00 UTC on December 9, the Philippine Atmospheric, Geophysical and Astronomical Services Administration (PAGASA) began to track the storm and assigned it with the local name Norming. At noon, PAGASA and the JMA upgraded the depression to a tropical storm, and six hours later, the JTWC followed suit. After crossing the 10th parallel north, Faith turned towards the west-northwest, and by December 10, the storm entered a period of rapid intensification. The JMA upgraded Faith into a severe tropical storm early on December 10, and twelve hours later, the JTWC classified Faith, just offshore Samar Island, as a typhoon.

The typhoon then tracked across the islands of Samar and Masbate, and next clipped the northern tip of Palawan Island before entering the South China Sea. At 18:00 UTC, the JMA upgraded Faith into a typhoon, while also estimating that it attained its peak intensity of 120 km/h (75 mph) and a minimum barometric pressure of 970 mbar (28.6 inHg). After clearing the Philippines, Typhoon Faith tracked westward and briefly moved west-southwest. On the evening of December 11, the JTWC increased the intensity to 170 km/h (105 mph), its peak wind speed. While maintaining peak intensity, Typhoon Faith slowly decelerated while tracking on a west-northwesterly course as it approached the Vietnamese coast due to the effects of another mid-latitude trough, which eroded the subtropical ridge to its north. As a result of this pattern change, Faith began to encounter increased wind shear, which triggered a weakening trend, and at 00:00 UTC on December 12, the JMA downgraded Faith into a severe tropical storm. (Note: Wind estimates from the JMA and most other basins throughout the world are sustained over 10 minutes, while estimates from the United States-based Joint Typhoon Warning Center are sustained over 1 minute. 10-minute winds are about 1.14 times the amount of 1-minute winds.) At 00:00 UTC on December 14, Faith made landfall in Vietnam just north of Nha Trang. At the time of landfall, the JTWC estimated winds of 115 km/h (70 mph) while the JMA determined that Faith had weakened to a tropical depression. Once inland, the storm began to quickly dissipate; the JMA ceased tracking the system at noon the same day.

== Preparations and impact ==
=== Philippines ===
In advance of the typhoon, authorities issued a No. 3 storm signal, even though only a No. 1 storm signal was issued for Manila. On December 13, all classes in Manila were suspended. Sixteen Philippine Airlines flights to and from the central Philippines were cancelled. In the capital city of Manila, heavy rains caused street flooding. Several villages on Samar island were flooded. Around 400 people combined in the Catanduanes and Aklan provinces were evacuated to shelter due to rising floodwaters. A grocery store in Ibajay collapsed due to high winds. Toppled posts and downed trees clogged highways in the province of Sorsogon. Two bodies were recovered off Dumaguete. Offshore, the Philippine Navy rescued 100 people from a ferry traveling from the Philippines to Malaysia. A 12 m (40 ft) boat sunk offshore Zamboanga City; all 10 of its crew were rescued to safety. Off of Pilas Island, four people were rescued and eleven were missing when the boat Myra-1 sank in heavy seas. Seventeen passengers were rescued, fourteen people were rendered missing, and two bodies were recovered when high waves toppled the motor vessel Lion No. 3.

Overall, 33 people were killed, with 30 others wounded and 36 others listed missing. A total of 6,423 homes were damaged and 3,234 houses were destroyed, leaving more than 20,000 homeless. Damage was estimated at $25.9 million, (Note: All currencies are converted to United States Dollars using Philippines Measuring worth with an exchange rate of the year 1998.) with $6.82 million from crops, $15.9 million from public infrastructure, and $3.37 million from private infrastructure. The storm affected 17 provinces, and 135 evacuation centers were opened. Following the storm, Philippines President Joseph Estrada pledged emergency funding for four provinces struck by the typhoon, along with a series of wintertime rainstorms.

=== Vietnam ===
The strongest sustained wind on land due to the impact of the storm on Vietnamese soil was measured at 13 m/s (43 km/h), recorded in Tuy Hoa, Phu Yen province. Due to the combined effects of the storm and a cold wave, rainfall in provinces and municipalities from Da Nang to Khanh Hoa was widespread at 250 to 400 mm. Specifically, in Tam Ky, Quang Nam province, the rainfall reached up to 749 mm.

Faith was the second tropical cyclone to affect Vietnam that month, following Tropical Storm Dawn. Twenty-one people were killed in Khanh Hoa Province and Binh Dinh Province, including five in Da Nang. Nationwide, at least 38 people were killed in Vietnam with over 10,000 evacuated due to flooding in low-lying areas. Damage in Vietnam exceeded $20 million. A total of 602 homes were destroyed, another 16,327 were damaged, and 58,487 ha (144,520 acres) of rice fields were inundated. The typhoon destroyed a Vietnamese offshore platform at Prince Consort Bank [vi] in the Spratly Islands, killing three people.

== See also ==
- Typhoon Nancy (1982)
