= List of storms named Nalgae =

The name Nalgae (Korean: 날개, [na̠ɭɡɛ]) has been used for four tropical cyclones in the western North Pacific Ocean. The name was contributed by North Korea and means wing in Korean.

- Tropical Storm Nalgae (2005) (T0506, 06W) – stayed at sea
- Typhoon Nalgae (2011) (T1119, 22W, Quiel) – impacted the northern Philippines a few days after Typhoon Nesat devastated the same area
- Tropical Storm Nalgae (2017) (T1711, 13W) – stayed at sea
- Severe Tropical Storm Nalgae (2022) (T2222, 26W, Paeng) – a large and deadly storm that devastated the Philippines, killing 150 people

The name Nalgae was retired following the 2022 Pacific typhoon season and was replaced with Jamjari (Korean: 잠자리, [t͡ɕa̠md͡ʑa̠ɾi]), which means dragonfly in Korean.
