= List of storms named Neville =

The name Neville has been used for three tropical cyclones in the Australian region.

- Cyclone Neville (1992) – a powerful tropical cyclone hit the Northern Territory minor damage.
- Cyclone Neville (2010) – never threatened land.
- Cyclone Neville (2024) – a Category 4 severe tropical cyclone passed north of the Cocos Islands.
