= List of storms named Nona =

The name Nona has been used for three tropical cyclones worldwide: one in the Central Pacific Ocean and two in the West Pacific Ocean, including one in the Philippine Area of Responsibility.

In the Central Pacific:

- Tropical Storm Nona (1994) – did not affect land.

In the West Pacific:

- Typhoon Nona (1952) (T5212) – a Category 1-equivalent typhoon that affected the Philippines, China, and Vietnam.
- Typhoon Melor (2015) (T1527, 28W, Nona) – a Category 4-equivalent typhoon that made landfall in the Philippines, causing 51 fatalities.

The name Nona was retired following the 2015 Pacific typhoon season and was replaced with Nimfa.
