= List of storms named Nika =

The name Nika has been used for two tropical cyclones in the Philippine Area of Responsibility by PAGASA in the Western Pacific Ocean. It replaced the name Nina after it was retired following the 2016 Pacific typhoon season.

- Tropical Storm Nangka (2020) (T2016, 18W, Nika) – became the wettest tropical cyclone in the West Pacific.
- Typhoon Toraji (2024) (T2423, 26W, Nika) – a Category 1-equivalent typhoon that simultaneously existed with three other typhoons in November.

The name Nika was retired following the 2024 Pacific typhoon season and was replaced with Nanolay, which refers to a local omnipotent creator of everything in Gaddang.

== See also ==
- Typhoon Niki (1996) – a Category 2-equivalent Pacific typhoon with a similar name.
