= List of storms named Nisha =

The name Nisha has been used for four tropical cyclones worldwide: one in the North Indian Ocean and three in the South Pacific Ocean.

In the North Indian:

- Cyclone Nisha (2008) – made landfall in Tamil Nadu, India, killed at least 204 people, and did at least $800 million (2008 USD) in damages

In the South Pacific:

- Cyclone Nisha–Orama (1983) – formed and existed at the same time as Severe Tropical Cyclone Oscar
- Cyclone Nisha (1993) – remained away from highly populated islands
- Cyclone Nisha (2010) – weak storm that remained away from highly populated islands
