= List of storms named Nelson =

The name Nelson has been used for three tropical cyclones in the Western Pacific Ocean, one in the Australian region and one extratropical cyclone in Europe.

In the Western Pacific:

- Typhoon Nelson (1982) (T8202, 02W, Bising), the second tropical cyclone to strike the Philippines within a week in March 1982
- Typhoon Nelson (1985) (T8510, 11W, Ibiang), the worst tropical cyclone to affect Southern China in 16 years
- Typhoon Nelson (1988) (T8824, 20W, Paring), a Category 5-equivalent super typhoon which became the most intense typhoon of the season

In the Australian region:

- Cyclone Nelson (2007) – a Category 2 tropical cyclone that affected Northern Territory and Queensland

In Europe:

- Storm Nelson (2024), affected the British Isles, the Iberian Peninsula and France
