= List of storms named Narsing =

The name Narsing was used for nine tropical cyclones in the Philippines by the PAGASA and its predecessor, the Philippine Weather Bureau, in the Western Pacific Ocean:

- Severe Tropical Storm Gilda (1965) (T6512, 15W, Narsing) – a relatively strong tropical storm which hit northern Philippines and southern China.
- Typhoon Elsie (1969) (T6911, 14W, Narsing) – a powerful typhoon that impacted Taiwan and eastern China, claiming at least 102 lives.
- Typhoon Ruth (1973) (T7318, 20W, Narsing) – a moderate typhoon that crossed northern and central Luzon, killing 27 people.
- Tropical Depression Narsing (1977) – a short-lived tropical depression which was tracked by PAGASA, Japan Meteorological Agency (JMA) and the Joint Typhoon Warning Center (JTWC).
- Tropical Depression Narsing (1981) – another weak tropical disturbance that was only recognized by PAGASA.
- Tropical Storm Val (1985) (T8517, 16W, Narsing) – a moderately strong tropical storm which brushed northern Philippines, southern Taiwan and southern Mainland China.
- Severe Tropical Storm Roger (1989) (T8917, 20W, Narsing) – a fairly powerful tropical storm that produced significant rainfall on several islands in Japan.
- Tropical Depression Narsing (1993) – a minimal and poorly-organized tropical system which was only monitored by PAGASA.
- Typhoon Ivan (1997) (T9723, 27W, Narsing) – a violent and long-lasting typhoon that later skirted northeastern Luzon.

Preceded by Miling	Pacific typhoon season names Narsing	Succeeded by Openg
