= Tropical Storm Nestor (2019) =

Atlantic tropical storm

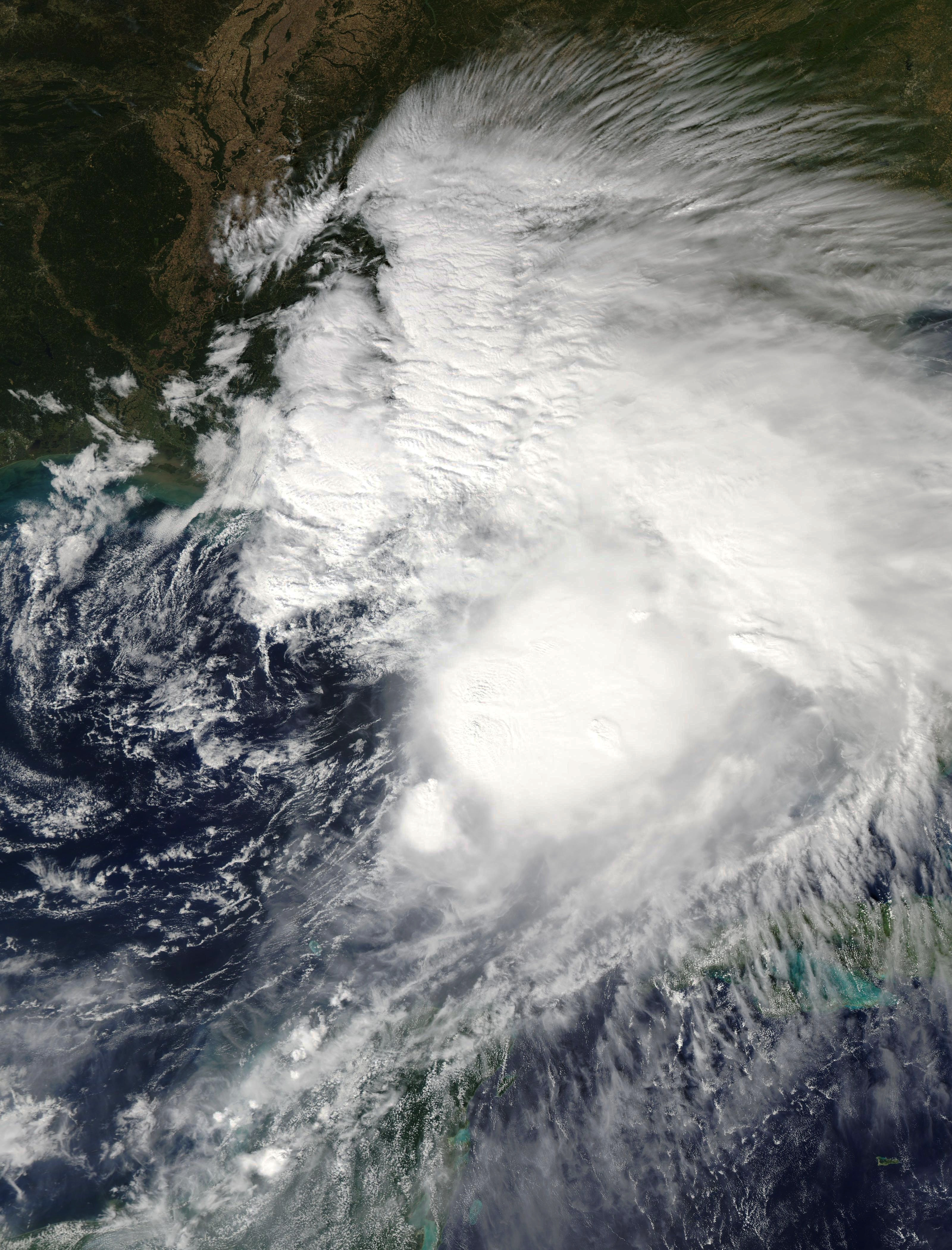
- Nestor shortly after being classified as a tropical storm on October 18

Meteorological history
- Formed: October 18, 2019
- Extratropical: October 19, 2019
- Dissipated: October 21, 2019

Tropical storm
- 1-minute sustained (SSHWS/NWS)
- Highest winds: 60 mph (95 km/h)
- Lowest pressure: 996 mbar (hPa); 29.41 inHg

Overall effects
- Fatalities: 3 indirect
- Damage: $150 million (2019 USD)
- Areas affected: Central America, Yucatan Peninsula, Southeastern United States
- IBTrACS
- Part of the 2019 Atlantic hurricane season

Tropical Storm Nestor was a large but short-lived and disorganized tropical cyclone which caused widespread tornadoes and heavy rain in the Southeastern United States during mid-October 2019. The sixteenth depression and fourteenth named storm of the 2019 Atlantic hurricane season, Nestor originated from a broad area of low pressure over the Western Caribbean. It emerged in the Gulf of Mexico and began to organize slightly, becoming Potential Tropical Cyclone Sixteen due to its threat to the Southeastern United States. It gained sufficient circulation to be designated Tropical Storm Nestor near the Florida Panhandle early on October 18, crawling to the northeast, and then finally transitioning into an extratropical cyclone due to strong shear from a nearby upper-level low before making landfall on the Florida Panhandle on October 19.

== Meteorological history ==
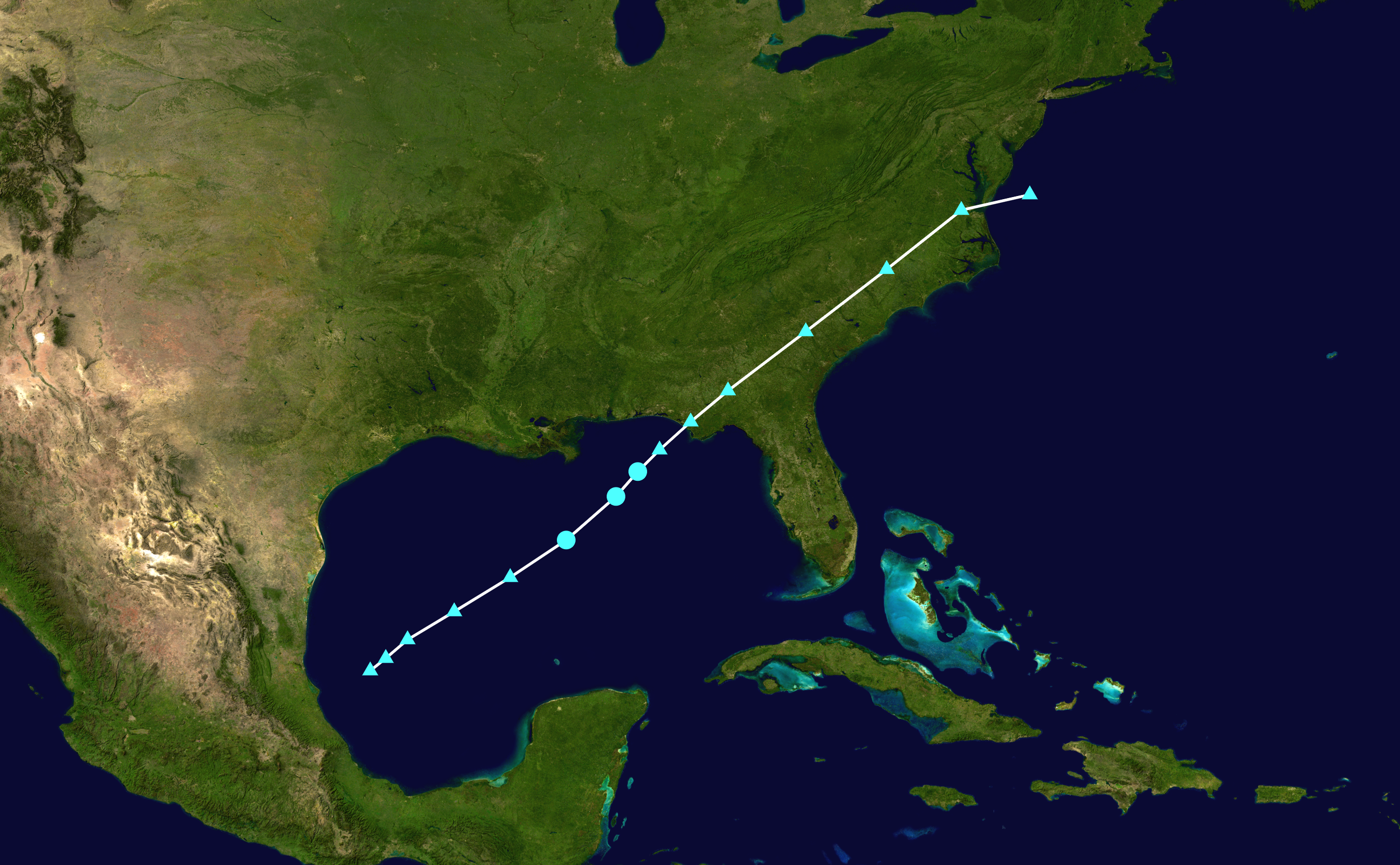
Map plotting the storm's track and intensity, according to the Saffir–Simpson scale Map key Saffir–Simpson scale Tropical depression (≤38 mph, ≤62 km/h) Tropical storm (39–73 mph, 63–118 km/h) Category 1 (74–95 mph, 119–153 km/h) Category 2 (96–110 mph, 154–177 km/h) Category 3 (111–129 mph, 178–208 km/h) Category 4 (130–156 mph, 209–251 km/h) Category 5 (≥157 mph, ≥252 km/h) Unknown Storm type Tropical cyclone Subtropical cyclone Extratropical cyclone, remnant low, tropical disturbance, or monsoon depression

On October 10, the NHC began to monitor for a poorly defined area of low pressure that was forecast to form near Central America. The low developed on October 11 and meandered almost parallel to the coast of Honduras for the next few days, before finally crossing over Central America near the Yucatan Peninsula on October 14. The low fully emerged into the Bay of Campeche on October 16 after bringing heavy rain to Central America and due to the warm temperatures in the Gulf of Mexico at the time, convection significantly improved with the system near the center and it was given a medium chance of development. The system became very broad but proceeded to be designated as Potential Tropical Cyclone Sixteen the proceeding day due to its threat to the United States Gulf Coast. The disturbance intensified over the following hours, attaining winds up to 60 mph (97 km/h), with cloud tops colder than -80° enveloping the center. The disturbance's circulation, however remained elongated, and was still not named. Later that evening on October 18, the circulation improved and became more defined, while the system was finally designated Tropical Storm Nestor.

Potential Tropical Cyclone Sixteen on October 17, 2019

Nestor began to then accelerate to the northeast aided by a ridge to its northeast, although wind shear generated by a nearby trough almost embedded within the northern side of the cyclone began to give Nestor a lopsided appearance on satellite imagery shortly after its designation. Due to Nestor's broad nature, gale-force winds were already beginning to be observed near the coast of Florida Panhandle. The system began to slow down as wind shear generated by the trough caused the storm to weaken as it neared the Florida Panhandle coast. Nestor rapidly lost its tropical characteristics due to interaction with this trough, and was declared to have become an extratropical cyclone early on October 19, however still bringing storm surge and heavy rains to the coast anyway. Nestor's post-tropical remnant then made landfall in St. Vincent Island, Florida with winds up to 45 mph, becoming further disorganized across the Southeastern United States for the next couple of days. On October 21, Nestor's extratropical remnant was absorbed into another extratropical storm off the coast of the Southeastern United States.

== Preparations ==
With the designation of Potential Tropical Cyclone Sixteen, the National Weather Service (NWS) issued Tropical Storm Warnings and Watches for the majority of the Florida Panhandle coast. Storm Surge Watches were also issued ahead of the storm. Parts of Southern Louisiana and Alabama also received Tropical Storm Warnings, but were removed shortly after the storm's track shifted predominantly towards to the Florida Panhandle. Tornado watches were then issued shortly after the storm became post-tropical for much of Northern Florida and some parts of Georgia.

== Impacts ==
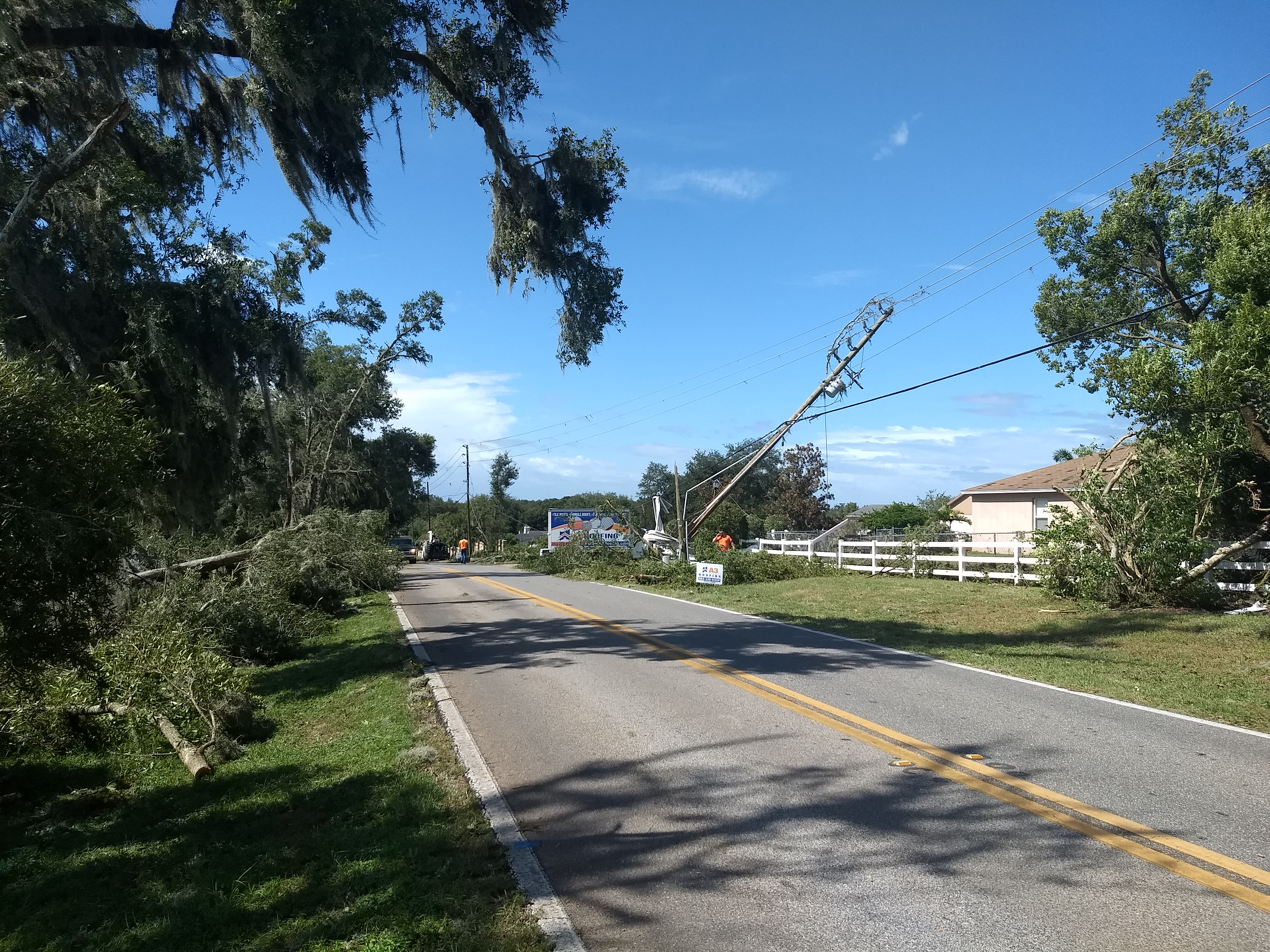
Aftermath of an EF2 tornado in Polk County, Florida on October 19, 2019, caused by Nestor.

As Nestor began to approach the coast of the Florida Panhandle, the same region that was severely affected by Hurricane Michael the previous year, it led to winds to gale-force and storm surge to take upon the region. Tides 2–4 feet above normal were recorded in several parts of the region as well, causing some minor coastal flooding. Heavy rain and the surging waves generated by the storm system also caused flash flooding in parts of the region, with some areas topping with 4 inches of rain. These rains, however, proved to be somewhat beneficial. A drought in the Southeastern United States was relieved as Nestor and its post-tropical remnant brought rain to the areas, with a meteorologist stating "The rain on the whole was a positive for the entire region – unless you had outdoor plans.".

Perhaps the legacy of Nestor, however, was the small tornado outbreak it caused across the Southeastern United States. Although Nestor was not classified as a tropical cyclone anymore at the time of its landfall, it spawned numerous supercells, which ultimately led to the spawning of several tornadoes. The National Weather Service (NWS) confirmed six tornadoes, one reaching EF2 status. One of the tornadoes, only reaching EF0 status, was recorded in Seminole, Florida and damaged a mobile home park. An EF2 tornado which tracked 9 miles also touched down in western Polk County, damaging over 50 homes and other buildings, including a middle school. The tornado also overturned an 18-wheeled vehicle which fell on top of a SUV, but no injuries were reported. The next day, an EF1 tornado formed near Cape Coral in Lee County damaging several homes. No injuries or deaths were reported from any of the tornadoes. An EF0 landspout tornado was sighted in Micco, but it caused no damage. One other EF0 tornado was confirmed in Cordele, Georgia, downing trees, shifting a barn off it foundation, and ripping part of a metal roof off an industrial building. Another EF0 tornado was confirmed on October 20 on the west side of Myrtle Beach, South Carolina, snapping and uprooting numerous trees, including fallen pine trees that damaged to two mobile homes.

3 indirect deaths occurred when heavy rains generated by Nestor's extratropical remnant caused a car crash in South Carolina.

== See also ==
- Other storms of the same name
- Tropical Storm Colin (2016) – similarly affected the Florida Panhandle
- Hurricane Hermine (2016) – took a similar track
- Hurricane Ivan (2004) – spawned many tornadoes in a similar area
- Hurricane Michael (2018) – severely affected the same area
- Tropical Storm Alberto (2018) – made landfall in similar location
- Tropical Storm Olga (2019) – similarly became extratropical before landfall
