= Hurricane Nate (2005) =

Category 1 Atlantic hurricane

- Hurricane Nate at peak intensity southeast of Bermuda on September 9

Meteorological history
- Formed: September 5, 2005
- Dissipated: September 13, 2005

Category 1 hurricane
- 1-minute sustained (SSHWS/NWS)
- Highest winds: 90 mph (150 km/h)
- Lowest pressure: 979 mbar (hPa); 28.91 inHg

Overall effects
- Fatalities: 2 direct (both combined with Hurricane Maria)
- Damage: None
- Areas affected: Bermuda; East Coast of the United States; Scotland; Norway
- IBTrACS
- Part of the 2005 Atlantic hurricane season

Hurricane Nate was a tropical cyclone that threatened Bermuda but remained at sea during early September 2005. The fourteenth named storm and seventh hurricane of the annual Atlantic hurricane season, Nate formed southwest of Bermuda on September 5 and initially moved very slowly to the northeast. Early forecasts suggested a possible threat to the island, but Nate passed well to its south as a Category 1 hurricane on September 8. After moving away from the island, the storm entered a region with cooler sea surface temperatures and unfavorable wind shear, causing it to weaken to a tropical storm before becoming extratropical on September 10. The extratropical remnant was later absorbed by a larger weather system.

The hurricane caused no structural damage while tropical, although it generated rip currents in combination with other storms that killed one person off the New Jersey coast. Nate dropped light rainfall and produced gusty winds on the island of Bermuda. The remnants of hurricanes Nate and Maria contributed to heavy rainfall in parts of Scotland and later Western Norway, triggering a mudslide that killed one person. Canadian Navy ships en route to the US Gulf Coast, carrying relief supplies to assist in the aftermath of Hurricane Katrina, were delayed while trying to avoid Nate and Hurricane Ophelia.

== Meteorological history ==
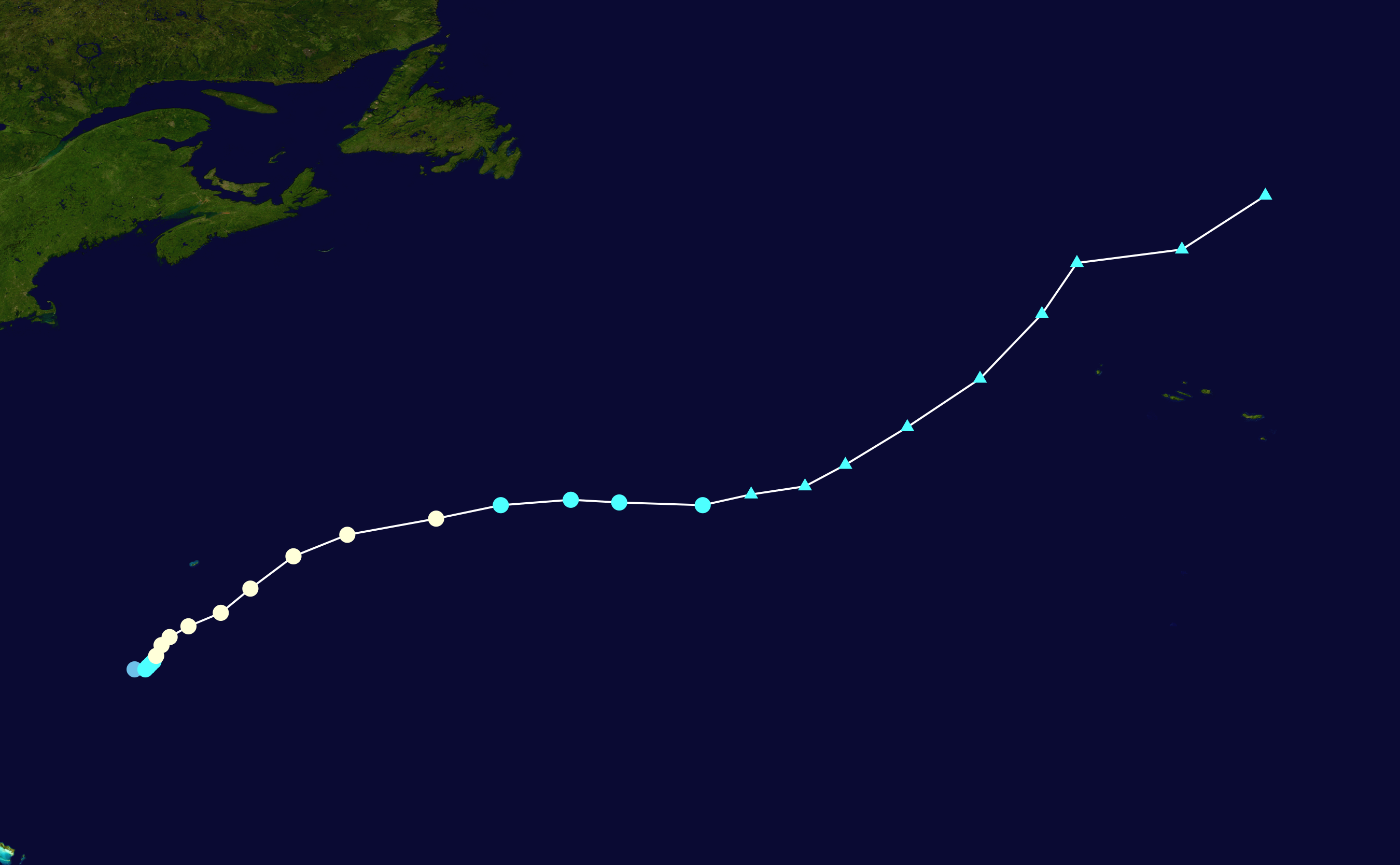
Map plotting the storm's track and intensity, according to the Saffir–Simpson scale Map key Saffir–Simpson scale Tropical depression (≤38 mph, ≤62 km/h) Tropical storm (39–73 mph, 63–118 km/h) Category 1 (74–95 mph, 119–153 km/h) Category 2 (96–110 mph, 154–177 km/h) Category 3 (111–129 mph, 178–208 km/h) Category 4 (130–156 mph, 209–251 km/h) Category 5 (≥157 mph, ≥252 km/h) Unknown Storm type Tropical cyclone Subtropical cyclone Extratropical cyclone, remnant low, tropical disturbance, or monsoon depression

A tropical wave emerged from the west coast of Africa on August 30 and tracked westward across the Atlantic Ocean, maintaining a vigorous area of convection along the wave axis. By September 1 most of the deep convection had been stripped away by southwesterly wind shear. Despite this, the wave remained well-defined as it continued west-northwest. The wave split into two pieces; the northern portion passed between the Leeward Islands and Hurricane Maria on September 3, while the southern portion moved into the Caribbean Sea. On September 4, the northern portion of the wave began to interact with an upper-level low pressure system and an elongated trough that was located between Bermuda and the Leeward Islands—the same trough which contributed to the development of Hurricane Ophelia. As a result of the low wind shear, convection redeveloped and organized along the wave axis. Convective banding formed around a broad surface low. It is estimated that the system developed into a tropical depression at 1800 UTC on September 5. At the time it was located approximately 350 miles (560 km) to the south-southwest of Bermuda.

Upon being designated, Tropical Depression Fifteen developed deep convection close to, and to the east of, the center of circulation. At the same time, banding features became better organized. Later on September 5, the overall cloud pattern improved while thunderstorm activity condensed and deepened within the increasingly well-defined circulation. Just six hours after being designated as a tropical depression, the cyclone intensified into a tropical storm; it was given the name Nate by the National Hurricane Center. Over the following two days, Nate drifted slowly northeastward towards Bermuda.

Within the early hours of September 6, Nate became quasi-stationary under a weak steering pattern between Hurricane Maria and a disturbance over The Bahamas. Satellite imagery indicated that the cloud pattern continued to organize with excellent outflow surrounding the storm. Late on September 6 a developing banding eye feature became evident. Tropical Storm Nate strengthened further and became a hurricane at 1200 UTC on September 7, as it began to turn away from Bermuda. Some models indicated that Nate could have been either absorbed by or merged with the larger Hurricane Maria, but the National Hurricane Center (NHC) forecast that Nate would survive as a separate system, which it did. The large low to the northeast of The Bahamas gradually opened into a broad trough as a shortwave trough approached from the northwest. The larger trough slowly became elongated in a northeast–southwest manner late on September 7. At the same time, the shortwave trough moved southward along the west side of the other trough. The increasing southwesterly flow along the southeast side of the broad trough caused Nate to accelerate northeastward. Nate reached its peak intensity of 90 mph (145 km/h) late on September 8 as it passed 120 miles (205 km) southeast of Bermuda, while its strongest winds remained well offshore.

While at peak intensity, the storm maintained a well-organized and "impressive" convective pattern. Soon after the storm peaked in strength, increasing wind shear and dry air caused Nate to weaken back into a tropical storm later on September 9. Satellite imagery showed that the cloud pattern began to rapidly deteriorate. The hurricane was downgraded to a tropical storm at 1800 UTC on September 9 and continued to weaken as wind shear increased in association with an approaching trough and a related cold front. By late on September 9, all of the already limited convective activity was confined to the eastern semicircle, leaving the low-level center exposed. The storm was reduced to a swirl of low-level clouds just hours later. Nate became extratropical the next day before becoming absorbed by a larger system by 0000 UTC on September 13, to the north-northeast of the Azores.

== Impact, records, and naming ==
Tropical Storm Nate intensifying on September 6

A tropical storm watch was issued for Bermuda early on September 7, and later that day a tropical storm warning and a hurricane watch superseded it. However, the storm did not reach the island, so the warnings were canceled as the storm moved away September 8. Four cruise ships left the island ahead of schedule, and flights were canceled in anticipation of Nate.

The outer bands of Nate brushed Bermuda with sustained winds of 35 mph (55 km/h) and widespread showers. Gusts were higher, peaking at roughly 50 mph (80 km/h). Less than 1 inch (25 mm) of rain was recorded at Bermuda International Airport. Damage in Bermuda was minimal. Two ships reported tropical storm-force winds in association with the storm: the Maersk New Orleans, to the north of the storm's center, and a ship with the call sign WCZ858 to the east-southeast. Rip currents from Nate and the more distant Maria killed one and injured another in New Jersey; several others were caught in rip currents, though they were able to escape. In the Carolinas, Nate also contributed to heightened seas, though this time in combination with Hurricane Ophelia and persistent unrelated northeasterly winds. A buoy just offshore Cape Fear recorded waves up to 12 ft (3.7 m).

Tropical energy from the remnants of Nate and Maria merged to form a broad storm system that would track toward parts of Europe. The mid-latitude cyclone produced a day of heavy rains across the Scottish Highlands that included a 24-hour precipitation total of 5.17 in (131 mm) on the Isle of Skye. As it continued north, the storm also dropped torrential rainfall over Western Norway. The region suffered extensive flooding and mudslides, including one that killed one person and injured nine more. Although the remnants of Nate and Maria avoided England, they broke a streak of above-average temperatures in the region, filtering down much cooler Arctic air. In places, this led to the first frost of the winter season. Temperatures down to −1.7 °C (28.9 °F) were recorded following the influx of colder air, with readings below freezing as far south as Hertfordshire.

Four Canadian Navy ships headed to the Gulf Coast of the United States, carrying relief supplies to help in the aftermath of Hurricane Katrina, were slowed down trying to avoid Hurricanes Nate and Ophelia. The convoy included a destroyer, two frigates, and an icebreaker, and developed a plan to travel between the two hurricanes to minimize damage to their cargo. Anticipating rough seas and gusty winds even with the altered course, crews secured onboard supplies which included generators, chainsaws, diapers, and cots. The genesis of Tropical Storm Nate continued the unprecedented levels of tropical activity during the 2005 hurricane season; when it developed on September 5, it was the earliest in any season that the fourteenth named tropical cyclone formed, surpassing the previous record held by an unnamed storm during the 1936 season. This record was later broken in 2020 when Tropical Storm Nana formed on September 1, four days earlier.

== See also ==
- Other tropical cyclones named Nate
- List of Category 1 Atlantic hurricanes
- List of Bermuda hurricanes
- List of New Jersey hurricanes
