= List of storms named Neil =

The name Neil has been used for three tropical cyclones worldwide: one in the West Pacific Ocean and two in the South Pacific Ocean.

In the West Pacific:

- Tropical Storm Neil (1999) – a strong tropical storm that affected Japan and South Korea.

In the South Pacific:

- Cyclone Neil (2000) - a Category 1 tropical cyclone that impacted Fiji.
- Cyclone Neil (2019) – a Category 1 tropical cyclone that caused little damage.
