= List of storms named Noru =

The name Noru (Korean: 노루, [no̞ɾu]) has been used for four tropical cyclones in the western North Pacific Ocean. The name was contributed by South Korea and means a roe deer (Capreolus pygargus) in Korean.

- Tropical Storm Noru (2004) (T0429, 32W) – remained out to sea.
- Tropical Storm Noru (2011) (T1113, 16W) – churned out of the ocean and merged with the extratropical remnants of Talas.
- Typhoon Noru (2017) (T1705, 07W) – a Category 4 super typhoon that impacted Japan and is tied as the second longest-lasting northwest Pacific tropical cyclone on record.
- Typhoon Noru (2022) (T2216, 18W, Karding) – a Category 5 super typhoon that caused destructive impacts in the Philippines and Vietnam.

The name Noru was retired following the 2022 Pacific typhoon season and was replaced with Hodu (Korean: 호두, [ɸʷo̞du]), which means walnut in Korean.
