= Typhoon Faye (1982) =

Pacific typhoon in 1982

Typhoon Faye (Norming)
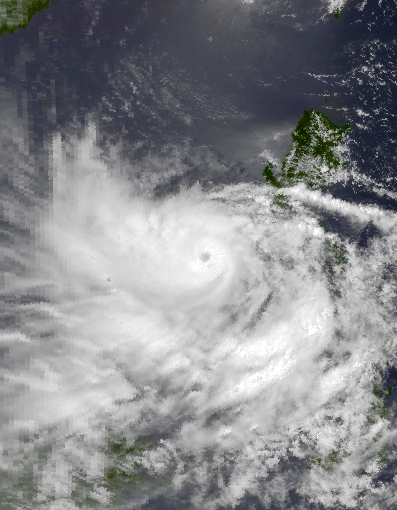
- Faye on August 23

Meteorological history
- Formed: August 17, 1982
- Dissipated: September 3, 1982

Typhoon
- 10-minute sustained (JMA)
- Highest winds: 150 km/h (90 mph)
- Lowest pressure: 960 hPa (mbar); 28.35 inHg

Category 2-equivalent typhoon
- 1-minute sustained (SSHWS/JTWC)
- Highest winds: 165 km/h (105 mph)

Overall effects
- Fatalities: 43
- Damage: $9.6 million (1982 USD)
- Areas affected: Philippines, Japan
- IBTrACS
- Part of the 1982 Pacific typhoon season

Typhoon Faye also known in the Philippines as Typhoon Norming was a long-lived and erratic typhoon that struck the Philippines in August 1982. On August 16, a weak tropical disturbance was moving towards the southern Philippines. Initially, land interaction with the Philippines with prevented significant development. After crossing the Philippines, the disturbance emerged into the South China Sea and increased in organization. It was upgraded into a tropical storm by midday on August 22. Thereafter, Faye began to steadily strengthen, and attained typhoon intensity later that day. On August 23, Typhoon Faye reached its peak intensity, which the storm would maintain for approximately 12 hours. A small cyclone, Faye moved northward on August 24 due to the weakening of a ridge over China. Thereafter, its center was disrupted by land interaction with the Philippines. As such, the storm weakened slightly before striking Luzon on the morning of August 25. Severe flooding and strong winds were recorded. More than 5,000 houses were damaged while 220,000 were homeless. Furthermore, around 7,000 people sought shelter. There were 18 injuries and 41 deaths in the Philippines. Overall, damage amounted to $9.6 million (1982 USD). (Note: Some currencies are converted to United States Dollars using Philippines Measuring worth with an exchange rate of the year 1982.) Across Japan, two people perished.

Recurving to the northeast, Faye continued weakening due to strong wind shear, with dissipation as a tropical cyclone occurring on the afternoon of August 27. The remnants of the typhoon initially continued moving east-northeast before stalling that evening. Faye began to reorganize, and was estimated to have re-attained typical storm strength on August 28. Faye intensified slightly, nearly attaining typhoon intensity on August 29, but this trend was short-lived due to increased wind shear. By August 31, a building ridge to Faye's north led to a southwest motion as the system steadily weakened. However, Faye managed to maintain its identity as a weak tropical cyclone for several days, before finally dissipating on September 3.

== Meteorological history ==
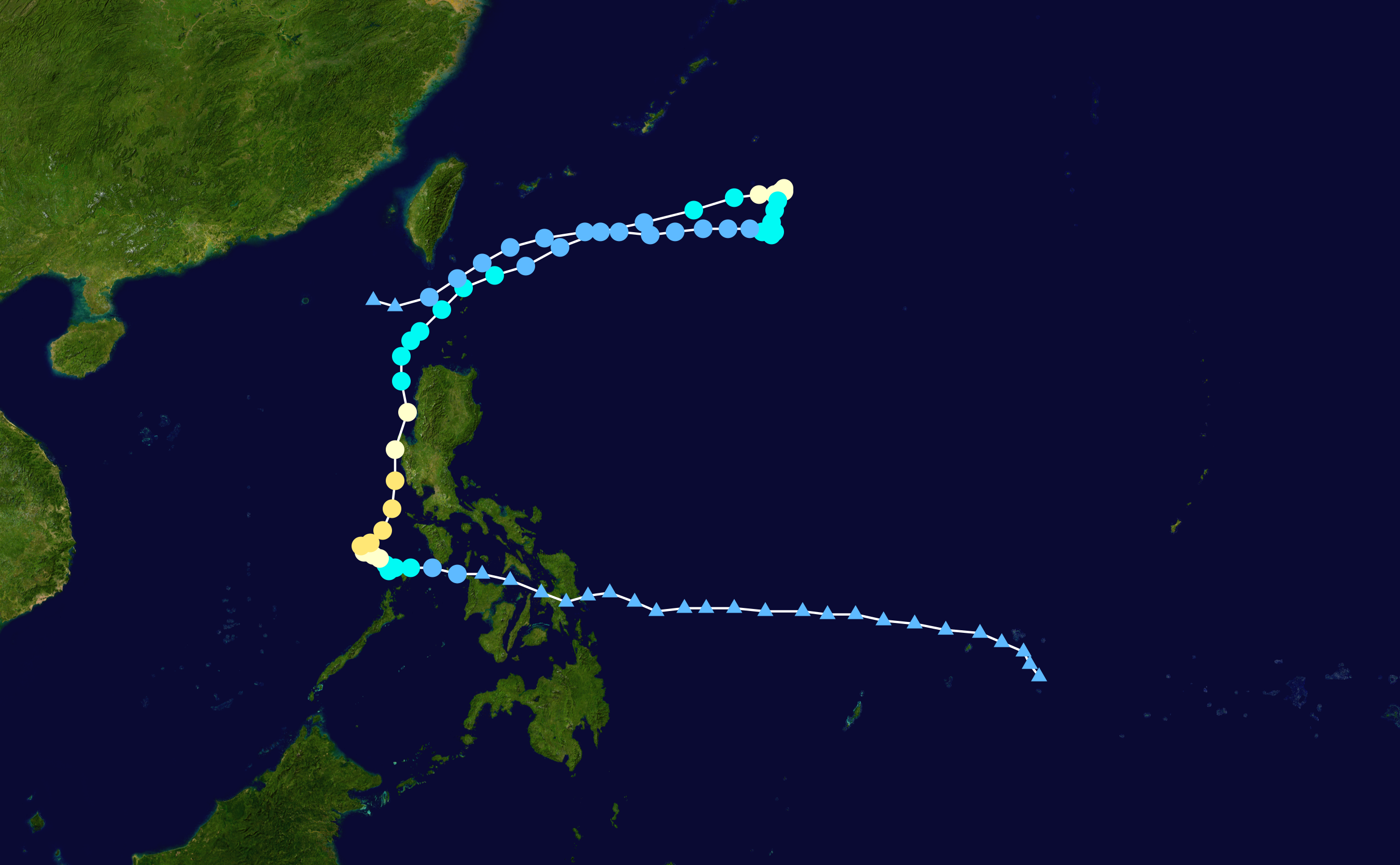
Map plotting the storm's track and intensity, according to the Saffir–Simpson scale Map key Saffir–Simpson scale Tropical depression (≤38 mph, ≤62 km/h) Tropical storm (39–73 mph, 63–118 km/h) Category 1 (74–95 mph, 119–153 km/h) Category 2 (96–110 mph, 154–177 km/h) Category 3 (111–129 mph, 178–208 km/h) Category 4 (130–156 mph, 209–251 km/h) Category 5 (≥157 mph, ≥252 km/h) Unknown Storm type Tropical cyclone Subtropical cyclone Extratropical cyclone, remnant low, tropical disturbance, or monsoon depression

Typhoon Faye originated from a westward-moving weak area of disturbed weather located within the Philippine Sea in the middle of August. On August 16, the Joint Typhoon Warning Center (JTWC) started monitoring the disturbance for possible development. Initially, little development was expected due to its close proximity to land and Typhoon Ellis. The disturbance was poorly organized and the atmospheric circulation was exposed from the deep convection despite being located near an anticyclone, which tends to favor tropical cyclogenesis. (Note: Wind estimates from the JMA and most other basins throughout the world are sustained over 10 minutes, while estimates from the United States-based Joint Typhoon Warning Center are sustained over 1 minute. 1 minute winds are about 1.14 times the amount of 10 minute winds.) On August 20, the Japan Meteorological Agency (JMA) started tracking the disturbance. (Note: The Japan Meteorological Agency is the official Regional Specialized Meteorological Center for the western Pacific Ocean.) Later that day, the Philippine Atmospheric, Geophysical and Astronomical Services Administration (PAGASA) also started monitoring the storm, assigning it with the local name Norming. After emerging into the South China Sea, the storm began to intensify. Later on the morning of August 20, the JTWC issued a Tropical Cyclone Formation Alert (TCFA) for the disturbance. At 0000 UTC on August 21, the JTWC upgraded the system into a tropical depression. Six hours later, the agency determined that the depression attained tropical storm status, naming it Faye.

Tropical Storm Faye slowly tracked west-northwest since a subtropical ridge was situated near Hong Kong; however, the presence of a cold front and Ellis prevented the ridge for strengthening. Despite moderate wind shear, Faye gradually intensified. Midday on August 22, the JMA classified Faye as a tropical storm. Meanwhile, the JTWC estimated that Faye reached typhoon status. Over the south China Sea, Faye continued to intensify, and according to the JMA, Faye also attained typhoon intensity on August 23. That afternoon, the JMA estimated that Faye reached peak intensity of 145 km/h (90 mph); it would maintain this intensity for about twelve hours. Around this time, the JTWC expected Faye to move westward since the ridge atop of southern China was expected to build. Instead, the typhoon turned north as the ridge over southern China weakened, and a trough was noted between Ellis and Faye. On the morning of August 24, the JTWC assessed the peak intensity of the storm at 170 km/h (105 mph). This intensity is equivalent to a moderate Category 2 hurricane on the United States-based Saffir-Simpson Hurricane Wind Scale. Shortly after its peak, the typhoon started to weaken as its circulation interacted with the Philippines. At 1800 UTC that day, the storm made landfall in Luzon. At that time, the JMA estimated winds of 130 km/h (80 mph).

Due to a combination of land interaction and strong wind shear from Typhoon Ellis, Faye became less organized. At 0000 UTC on August 25, the JMA downgraded Faye to a severe tropical storm while the JTWC reduced it to tropical storm status. After re-emerging into open water, Faye turned northeast under the influence of Typhoon Ellis. Initially, re-intensification was expected to occur; however, the shear did not relent. Late on August 26, the JMA estimated that Faye was no longer a tropical storm. By August 27, Faye began to turn east despite the JTWC forecasting the storm to continue northeast and pass west of Japan. Additionally, Faye continued to weaken, and by that time, all the thunderstorm activity was displaced from the center. At 0600 UTC on August 27, the JTWC discontinued warnings on the system as only a few areas of thunderstorm activity remained present. Despite this, the JMA continued to track the cyclone.

The remnants of Faye continued on an east-northeasterly track, despite indications from tropical cyclone forecast models that the cyclone would move northeast. Late on August 27, Faye stalled between a trough and Typhoon Gordon. Thus, environmental conditions became considerably more conductive, and Faye began to rapidly intensify again. At 0000 UTC on August 28, data from both the JTWC and the JMA suggested that Faye regenerated into a tropical storm. Operationally, the JTWC did not resume watching the cyclone until six hours later. At 0900 UTC, the JTWC upgraded Faye back to a typhoon, just a mere 27 hours after the agency discontinued watching the system for the first time. However, data from the JMA indicates that only slight intensification occurred during this time. Shortly thereafter, a Hurricane Hunter aircraft measured winds of 130 km/h (80 mph). Early on August 29, the JMA estimated that Faye attained winds of 105 km/h (65 mph), its secondary peak intensity. At 1500 UTC, the JTWC demoted Faye to a tropical storm. Subsequently, Faye began to gradually weaken due to increased wind shear caused by a trough, which resulted in all of the deep convection to become displaced from the center. On August 31, Faye slowly began drifting westward as a ridge deepened south of Japan. At 0600 UTC on August 31, the JTWC downgraded Faye to a tropical depression under the anticipation that Tropical Depression Faye would dissipate within 24 to 48 hours. Accelerating, Faye managed to maintain its circulation for much longer than anticipated. On the morning of September 3, the JMA stopped watching Faye; the JTWC followed suit around this time as the surface circulation had dissipated within the Sea of Japan. The remnants of the system became absorbed into the monsoon trough, which eventually spawned Typhoon Hope off the west coast of China.

== Preparations and impact ==
When Faye struck the central portion of the Philippines, three people were initially reported as missing. The typhoon brought heavy rainfall to Luzon, resulting in overflowing rivers, which in turn flooded low-lying areas. Numerous roads and bridges were washed out. Coconut trees were uprooted, while sugarcane and rice suffered severe damage. There, damage to crops, school buildings, and fish ponds totaled $1.5 million. When the typhoon veered toward the island nation for the second time, school classes were briefly halted and six flights of the Philippine Airlines were called off. Typhoon warnings were posted for much of the northern portion of the country.

Due to its second landfall, Faye brought significant destruction. Forty-one people were killed, at least 19 of which died due to flying debris, drownings or shipwrecks. Offshore Palawan, Faye capsized a boat, killing seven of the 54 aboard; the remaining were rescued. In Iba, the typhoon de-roofed 80% of the city's homes, where 200,000 out of 500,000 residents were rendered homeless, which is 40% of the city's population. Around 40% of the city's crops were wiped out. In the La Union, Pangasinan, and Iloilo provinces, 1,286 residences were destroyed, sending 7,608 people to seek shelter in churches, schools and town halls.

Overall, damage amounted to $9.6 million; including $4 million in property damage. Moreover, 18 individuals were injured. Around 220,000 were homeless. In all, 5,365 homes were damaged due to Typhoon Faye. Although the typhoon passed well to the south of Japan, Faye killed two people there, including one due to a landslide.

== See also ==
- Typhoon Wayne (1986)
