= List of storms named Nigel =

The name Nigel has been used for two tropical cyclones worldwide, one the Atlantic Ocean, and one in the South Pacific Ocean.

In the Atlantic, where it replaced Nate after the 2017 season:

- Hurricane Nigel (2023) – a Category 2 hurricane that stayed at sea

In the South Pacific:

- Cyclone Nigel (1985) – a Category 3 severe tropical cyclone that affected Vanuatu and Fiji
