= List of storms named Nestor =

The name Nestor has been used for two tropical cyclones worldwide: one in the Atlantic Ocean, and one in the western Pacific Ocean.

In the Atlantic:

- Tropical Storm Nestor (2019), a short lived tropical storm that affected the Southeastern United States.

In the western Pacific:

- Typhoon Nestor (1997) (T9706, 07W), a Category 5 super typhoon that affected the Northern Mariana Islands.
