= Typhoon Koppu (2009) =

Pacific typhoon in 2009

Typhoon Koppu (Nando)
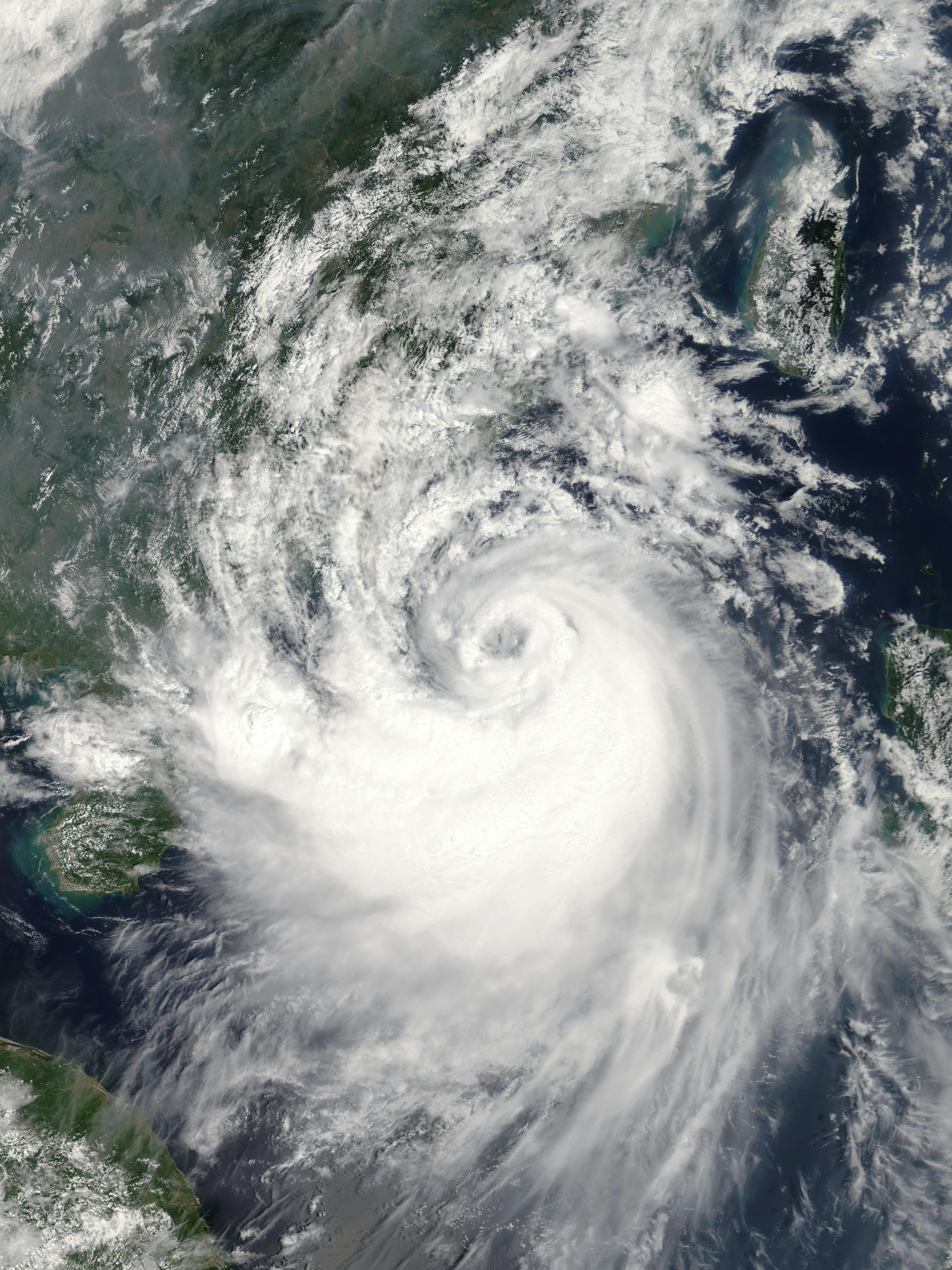
- Typhoon Koppu at peak intensity near Hong Kong on September 14, 2009

Meteorological history
- Formed: September 12, 2009
- Dissipated: September 16, 2009

Typhoon
- 10-minute sustained (JMA)
- Highest winds: 120 km/h (75 mph)
- Lowest pressure: 975 hPa (mbar); 28.79 inHg

Category 1-equivalent typhoon
- 1-minute sustained (SSHWS/JTWC)
- Highest winds: 140 km/h (85 mph)
- Lowest pressure: 967 hPa (mbar); 28.56 inHg

Overall effects
- Fatalities: 12 total
- Missing: 9
- Damage: $313 million (2009 USD)
- Areas affected: Macau, Hong Kong, China, Philippines
- IBTrACS
- Part of the 2009 Pacific typhoon season

Typhoon Koppu, (Note: The name Koppu (Japanese: コップ, [ko̞p̚pɯ̟]) was contributed by Japan and refers to the constellation Crater, the cup, in Japanese.) known in the Philippines as Typhoon Nando was a moderately strong typhoon which struck China, Macau, and Hong Kong in mid September 2009. The twenty-fourth tropical depression, fifteenth named storm, and sixth typhoon of the 2009 Pacific typhoon season, Koppu formed from an area of convectional clouds about 370 km (230 mi) north of Palau.

== Meteorological history ==
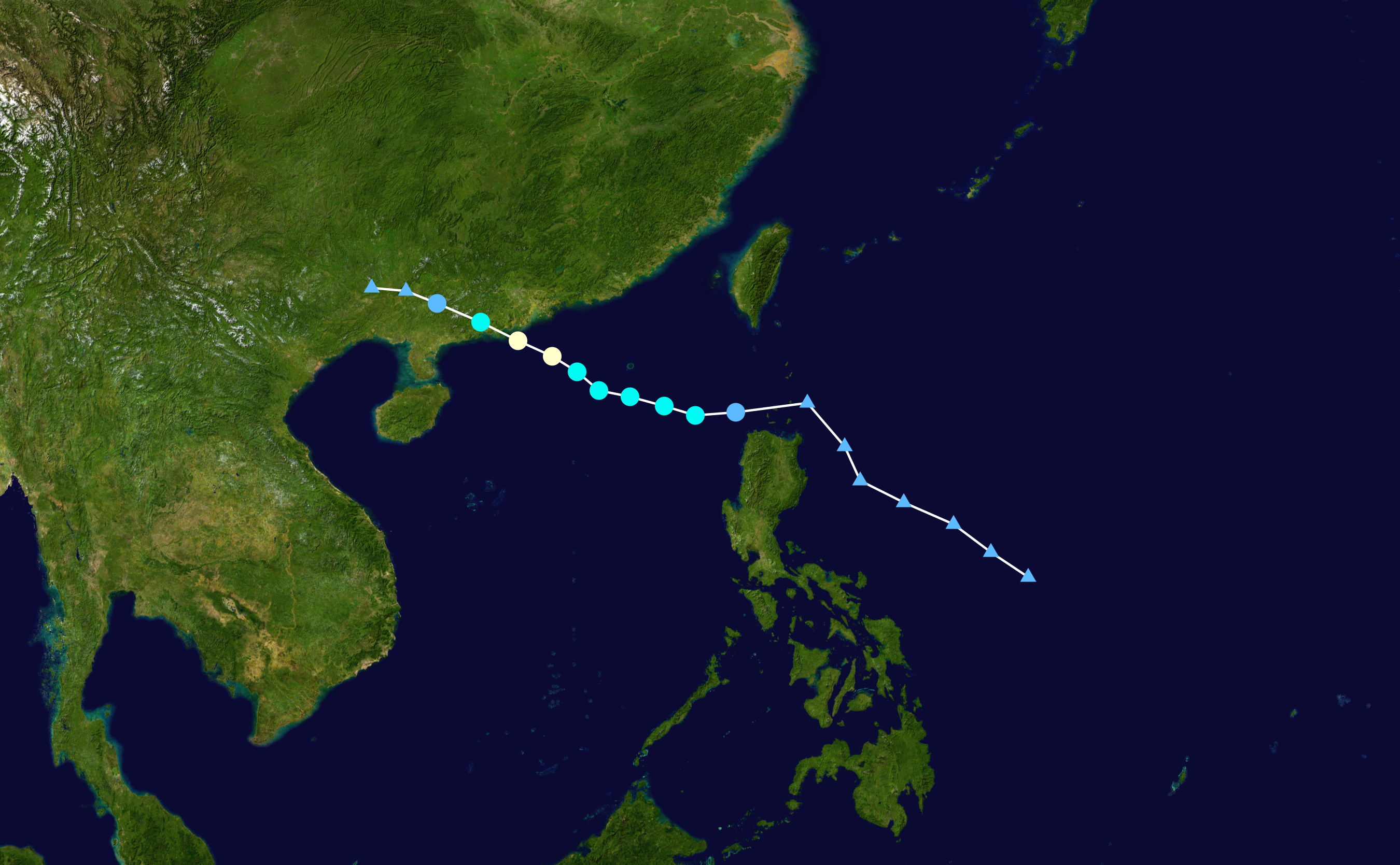
Map plotting the storm's track and intensity, according to the Saffir–Simpson scale Map key Saffir–Simpson scale Tropical depression (≤38 mph, ≤62 km/h) Tropical storm (39–73 mph, 63–118 km/h) Category 1 (74–95 mph, 119–153 km/h) Category 2 (96–110 mph, 154–177 km/h) Category 3 (111–129 mph, 178–208 km/h) Category 4 (130–156 mph, 209–251 km/h) Category 5 (≥157 mph, ≥252 km/h) Unknown Storm type Tropical cyclone Subtropical cyclone Extratropical cyclone, remnant low, tropical disturbance, or monsoon depression

On September 9, an area of convectional cloudiness associated with the monsoon trough formed 370 km (230 mi) to the northwest of Palau. Satellite imagery showed that a consolidating Low Level Circulation Centre (LLCC) with convection had started to develop and was wrapping toward the center. On September 11, the LLCC started to show improvement and was under moderate vertical shear with good westward outflow, but the JMA still upgraded the system to a minor tropical depression. Early of September 12, PAGASA upgraded the system in their responsibility and assigned its local name, Nando. At 1500 UTC, PAGASA reported that the depression made its landfall over northern Palanan, Isabela of the Philippines. However both JMA and JTWC reported that the depression did not make landfall but only crossed the Luzon strait. Early of the next day, JTWC upgraded the system into a tropical depression. Early of September 13, both JMA and JTWC upgraded the system as a tropical storm and assigned its international name, Koppu. In the afternoon, JMA reported that Koppu intensified into a severe tropical storm. On the 14th, the JMA reported that Koppu had intensified to a minimal typhoon, but the JTWC still kept Koppu as a tropical storm for the next few hours but later acknowledging the intensification and upgraded Koppu to a minimal typhoon. But the JTWC issued their final advisory early on September 15, as Koppu was moving over land, and was expected to dissipate quickly.

== Impact ==
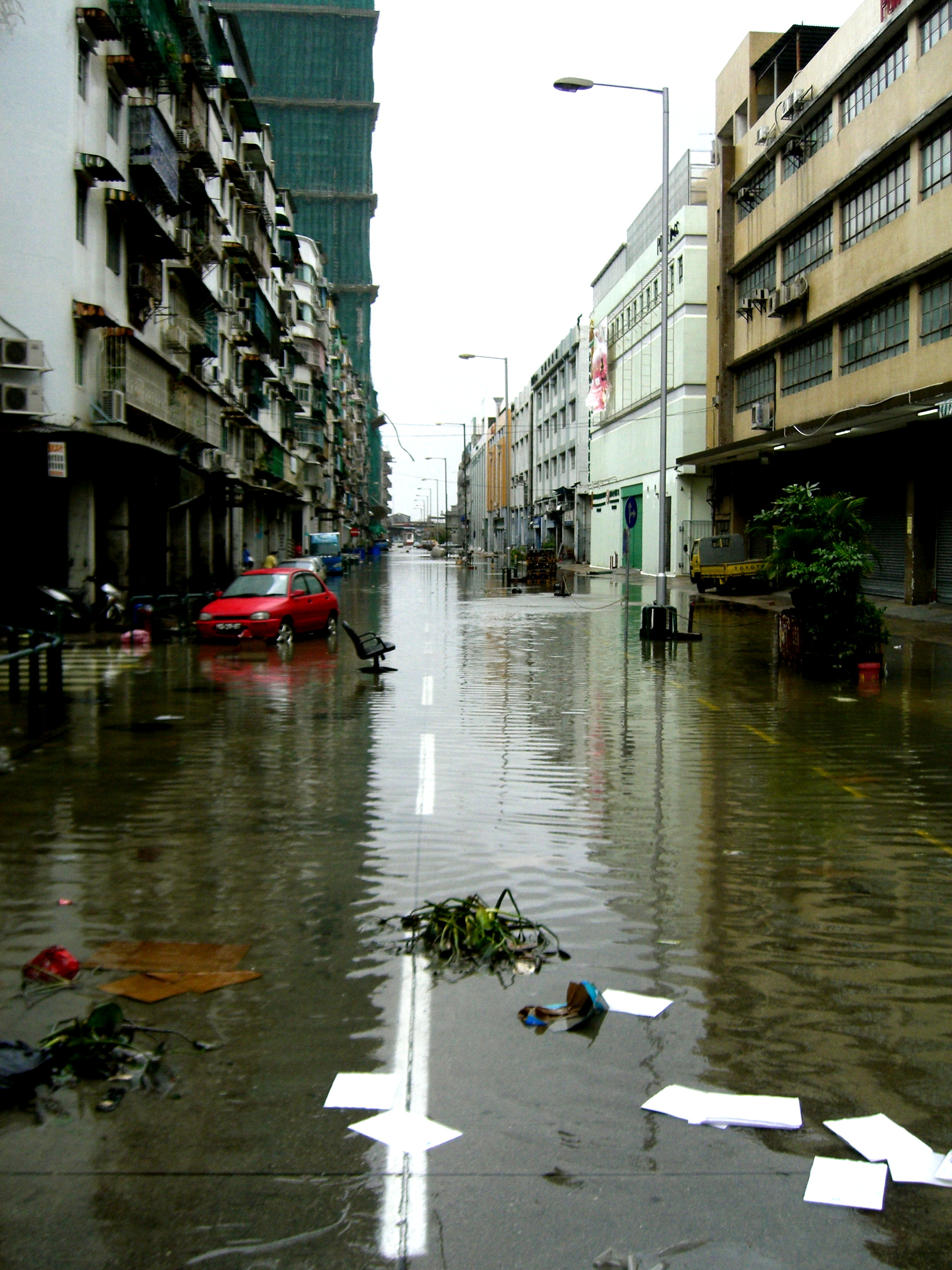
Flooding in Macau due to Typhoon Koppu

In Luzon, a 48-hour rainfall was experienced. In Visayas and Mindanao, a 24-hour rainfall was also experienced due to Nando's enhancing southwest monsoon. About 10 provinces were raised in signal warning no.1 from September 12 – September 13. Nando had triggered landslides resulting road closures and evacuations of some residents in Kalinga province. The storm then caused major flood in Luoding, People's Republic of China.
