= Typhoon Abby (1986) =

Pacific typhoon in 1986

Typhoon Abby (Norming)
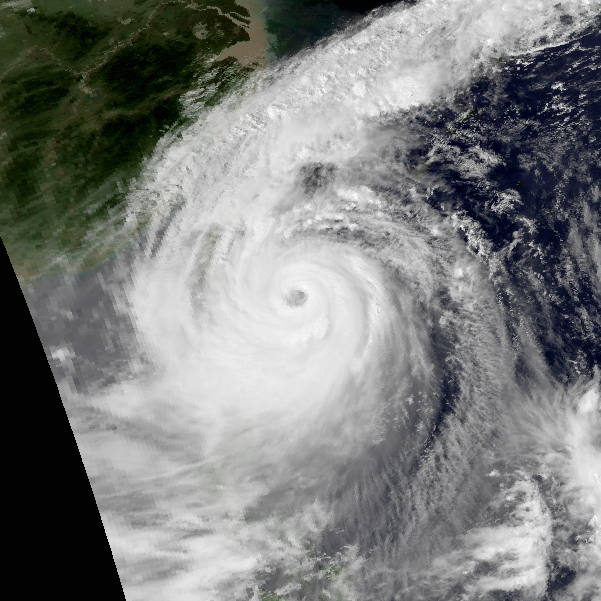
- Typhoon Abby nearing peak intensity while approaching Taiwan on September 18

Meteorological history
- Formed: September 13, 1986
- Extratropical: September 20, 1986
- Dissipated: September 24, 1986

Very strong typhoon
- 10-minute sustained (JMA)
- Highest winds: 155 km/h (100 mph)
- Lowest pressure: 945 hPa (mbar); 27.91 inHg

Category 2-equivalent typhoon
- 1-minute sustained (SSHWS/JTWC)
- Highest winds: 175 km/h (110 mph)
- Lowest pressure: 943 hPa (mbar); 27.85 inHg

Overall effects
- Fatalities: 13
- Damage: $81 million (1986 USD)
- Areas affected: Taiwan, Japan
- IBTrACS
- Part of the 1986 Pacific typhoon season

Typhoon Abby, known as Typhoon Norming in the Philippines, was the second typhoon to affect Taiwan in a month during September 1986. A tropical depression developed on September 13 and the next day attained tropical storm status, upon which it was named Abby. Continuing to intensify, Abby moved west-northwest and became a typhoon on September 16. Two days later, the typhoon attained maximum intensity. On September 19, the typhoon made landfall in Taiwan as it turned towards the northwest. Rapid weakening occurred due to land interaction, and on September 20, Typhoon Abby transitioned into an extratropical cyclone. Its extratropical remnants were last noted on September 24 as they raced off to the northeast.

The typhoon claimed 13 lives in Taiwan. Around 2 million people lost power due to the storm while greater than 20 houses were destroyed. Over 59,895 hectares (148,000 acres) of crops were damaged. Monetary damage totaled $81 million. In addition to effects on Taiwan, the extratropical remnants later brought heavy rains to Japan.

== Meteorological history ==
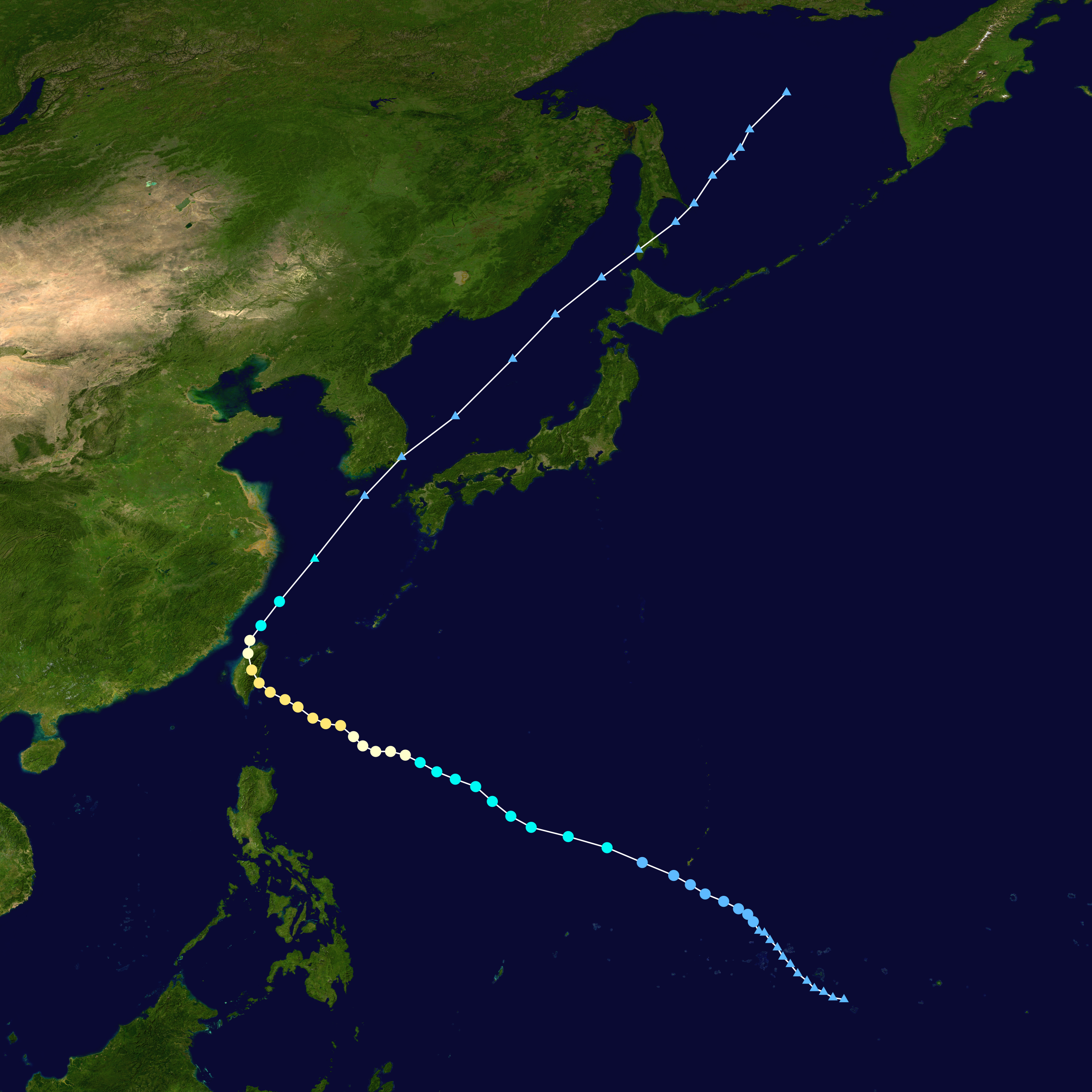
Map plotting the storm's track and intensity, according to the Saffir–Simpson scale Map key Saffir–Simpson scale Tropical depression (≤38 mph, ≤62 km/h) Tropical storm (39–73 mph, 63–118 km/h) Category 1 (74–95 mph, 119–153 km/h) Category 2 (96–110 mph, 154–177 km/h) Category 3 (111–129 mph, 178–208 km/h) Category 4 (130–156 mph, 209–251 km/h) Category 5 (≥157 mph, ≥252 km/h) Unknown Storm type Tropical cyclone Subtropical cyclone Extratropical cyclone, remnant low, tropical disturbance, or monsoon depression

During late August and early September 1986, the Western Pacific monsoon trough became displaced to the east. Lower than normal pressures favored the building of convection over the trough. By the evening of September 9, a pronounced area of disturbed weather developed southwest of the Truk Atoll. Aided by low wind shear, the disturbance developed slowly, even though the Hurricane Hunters initially failed to find a well-defined center. The disturbance drifted towards the northwest, and early on September 12, the Japan Meteorological Agency (JMA) started monitoring the system. (Note: The Japan Meteorological Agency is the official Regional Specialized Meteorological Center for the western Pacific Ocean.) Based on ship reports, the Joint Typhoon Warning Center (JTWC) classified the system as a tropical depression at 06:00 UTC on September 13. Both the JMA and JTWC upgraded the depression into Tropical Storm Abby at 00:00 UTC on September 14. (Note: Wind estimates from the JMA and most other basins throughout the world are sustained over 10 minutes, while estimates from the United States-based Joint Typhoon Warning Center are sustained over 1 minute. 10‑minute winds are about 1.14 times the amount of 1‑minute winds.)

On September 14, Abby, while moving west-northwest, began to develop a central dense overcast and thus began to intensify. On the morning of September 15, the JMA upgraded the system into a severe tropical storm. Despite reports from Hurricane Hunter aircraft indicating that low-and upper-level circulations were not properly aligned, both the JTWC and JMA estimated that Abby became a typhoon early on September 16.

At 06:00 UTC on September 18, the JMA reported that Abby attained its maximum intensity of 160 km/h (100 mph). Six hours later, the JTWC estimated that Abby reached its peak intensity of 175 km/h (110 mph). Moving northwest, the storm weakened slightly before making landfall in the eastern portion of Taiwan on September 19; the JTWC estimated winds of 170 km/h (105 mph) at the time of landfall. Due to land interaction, the storm rapidly weakened, with the low-level center re-curving towards the northeast. At 00:00 UTC on September 20, the JMA estimated that Abby weakened below typhoon intensity. Twelve hours later, the JTWC stopped monitoring the system while located 410 km (255 mi) southeast of Shanghai. Around this time, the JMA reported that Abby transitioned into an extratropical cyclone, although the JMA continued to track the system through the morning hours of September 24.

== Preparations and impact ==
As a result of the typhoon, travel to the Mid-Autumn Festival dropped by 20%. As a precaution, flights to Taiwan's two main airports, the Chiang Kai-shek Airport in suburban Taipei and Kaohsiung International Airport in the southern portion of the country, were diverted elsewhere, but the airports re-opened 12 hours after the cyclone passed.

Even though the storm weakened slightly prior to landfall, some areas of the country received 40 in (1,000 mm) of rain, after already having suffered severe damage from Typhoon Wayne a week earlier. In southern Taiwan, about 100 people were trapped in floodwaters after the typhoon damaged dikes. Thirteen people perished due to the typhoon and three others were injured. A 4-year-old girl and her 2-year-old brother died after she tried to light a candle in response to power outages caused by the typhoon. Two men drowned in floods while one man was killed when his motorcycle struck an electric pylon. Falling trees crushed four other victims. In addition to the fatalities, one man was listed as missing after his automobile fell from a bridge into a river in Taipei. Approximately 2 million people lost power due to the storm, while more than 200 houses were destroyed. Over 59,895 ha (148,000 acres) of crops were damaged. Damage totaled $81 million, but overall was less than expected.

The remnants of the storm brought showers and strong winds to parts of Japan. A precipitation maximum occurred in Yakushima, where 342 mm (13.5 in) of rain fell. Within a 24-hour time span, Tano received the highest rainfall, with a total of 330 mm (13 in). A peak wind gust of 39 km/h (24 mph) was measured on Yonaguni Island.

== See also ==
- Typhoon Agnes (1981)
