= Typhoon Nancy (1982) =

Pacific typhoon in 1982

Typhoon Nancy (Weling)
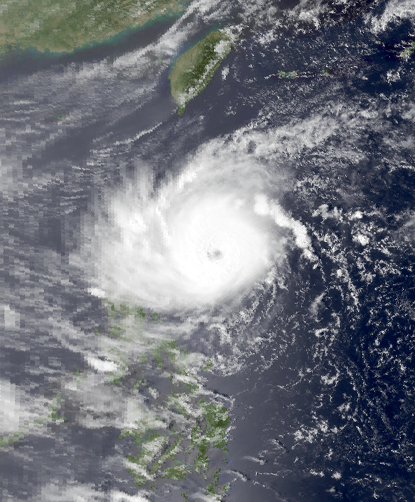
- Nancy at peak intensity on October 14

Meteorological history
- Formed: October 10, 1982
- Dissipated: October 20, 1982

Very strong typhoon
- 10-minute sustained (JMA)
- Highest winds: 185 km/h (115 mph)
- Lowest pressure: 935 hPa (mbar); 27.61 inHg

Category 4-equivalent typhoon
- 1-minute sustained (SSHWS/JTWC)
- Highest winds: 215 km/h (130 mph)
- Lowest pressure: 926 hPa (mbar); 27.34 inHg

Overall effects
- Fatalities: 167–380 (Note: Officially, the fatality count stood at 167: 96 in the Philippines (excluding the 30 missing) and 71 in Vietnam. However, another source stated that the final fatality count in the Philippines was 309, which would bring the total death toll to 380.)
- Missing: 30
- Damage: $56 million (1982 USD)
- Areas affected: Philippines; Vietnam
- IBTrACS
- Part of the 1982 Pacific typhoon season

Typhoon Nancy, known in the Philippines as Typhoon Weling, was a destructive typhoon that moved through Vietnam and the Philippines during October 1982. The typhoon originated from an area of convection and was first classified as a tropical cyclone on October 10. The system attained gale-force winds the next day, and slowly deepened thereafter. Although Nancy initially moved west, the system maintained a general westward course for much of its duration, striking Luzon on October 14 at peak intensity of 215 km/h (130 mph). It weakened to tropical storm strength overland, but re-intensified to typhoon intensity over the South China Sea. Nancy hit northern Vietnam on the October 18, and weakened almost immediately thereafter, before dissipating on October 20 inland over Vietnam.

In the Philippines, damage was the worst in Cagayan and Isabela. In the former, 4,378 homes were destroyed while 2,250 houses were destroyed in the latter. Nationwide, 96 people were killed and 30 others were listed as missing. Additionally, 186 were injured. A total of 12,464 homes were destroyed while 34,111 others were damaged. Moreover, 301,431 persons were "affected" by the storm, or 51,532 families. Damage totaled to $56 million (1982 USD), including $18 million from infrastructure and $26 million from agriculture. (Note: All currencies are converted to United States Dollars using Philippines Measuring worth with an exchange rate of the year 1982.) While striking Vietnam, the typhoon killed 30 people. Around 72,000 homes were destroyed, leaving 125,000 people homeless. Throughout the country, 450,000 acres (182,110 ha) of rice were destroyed.

== Meteorological history ==
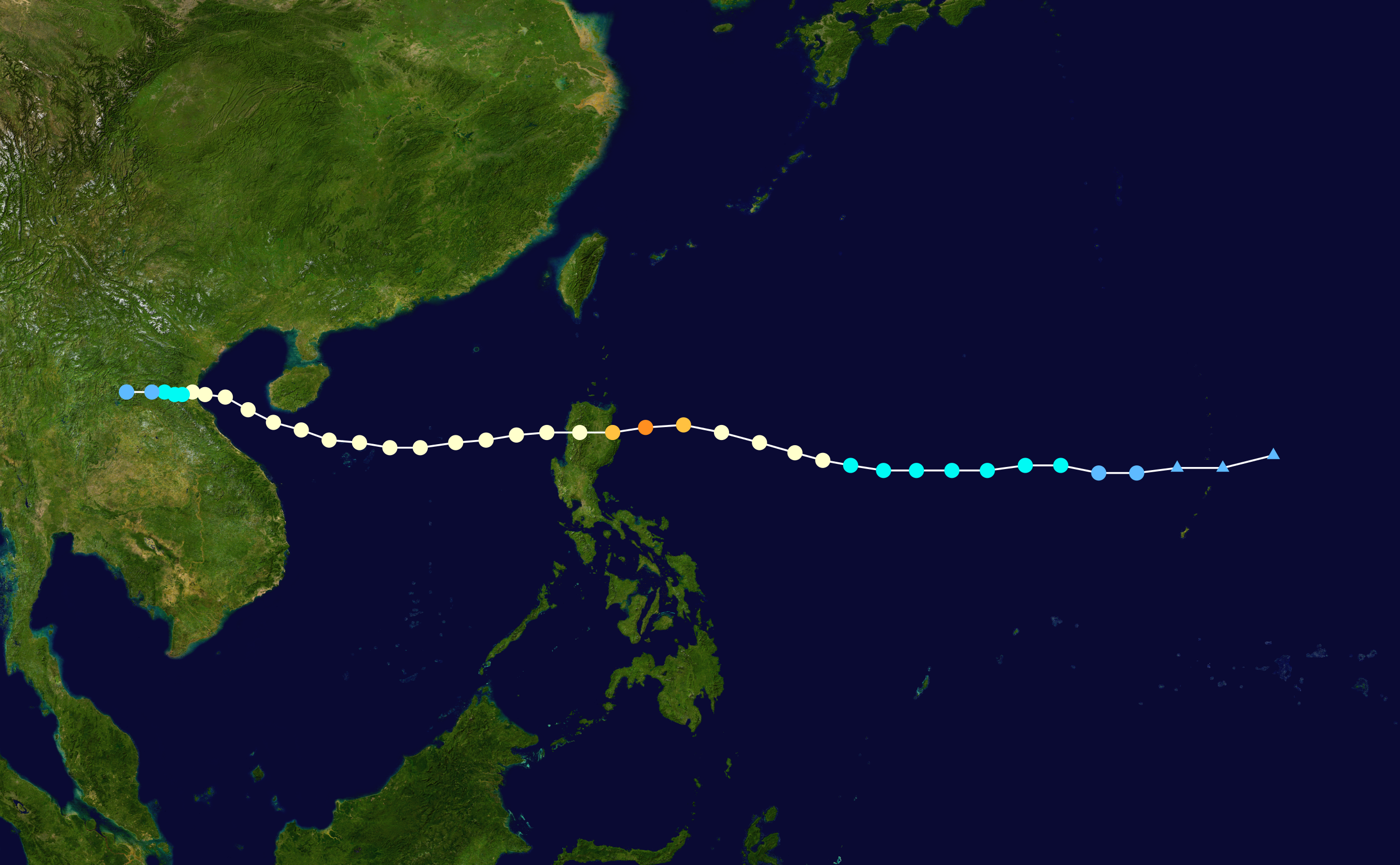
Map plotting the storm's track and intensity, according to the Saffir–Simpson scale Map key Saffir–Simpson scale Tropical depression (≤38 mph, ≤62 km/h) Tropical storm (39–73 mph, 63–118 km/h) Category 1 (74–95 mph, 119–153 km/h) Category 2 (96–110 mph, 154–177 km/h) Category 3 (111–129 mph, 178–208 km/h) Category 4 (130–156 mph, 209–251 km/h) Category 5 (≥157 mph, ≥252 km/h) Unknown Storm type Tropical cyclone Subtropical cyclone Extratropical cyclone, remnant low, tropical disturbance, or monsoon depression

Typhoon Nancy originated from a large area of convection situated in the middle of the Pacific Ocean, which, while drifting westward, began to consolidate on October 8 within a favorable environment aloft. The convection separated from an upper-level low embedded within a tropical upper-tropospheric trough (TUTT). Later that day, the area of convection degenerated into a "random area of cloudiness." The TUTT drifted west while the Joint Typhoon Warning Center (JTWC) reported that a tropical depression formed within the area of convection that was now located south of the TUTT. Early on October 10, the Japan Meteorological Agency (JMA) started watching the system. (Note: The Japan Meteorological Agency is the official Regional Specialized Meteorological Center for the western Pacific Ocean.) At 07:30 UTC, a Tropical Cyclone Formation Alert was issued by the JTWC while located 370 km (230 mi) north of Guam.

Following an increase in reorganization, a Hurricane Hunter flight indicated winds of 50 km/h (30 mph) early on October 11. Later that morning, the JMA upgraded the cyclone into a tropical storm. Following Hurricane Hunter reports, which indicated winds of 65 km/h (40 mph) and a barometric pressure of 999 mbar (29.5 inHg). (Note: Wind estimates from the JMA and most other basins throughout the world are sustained over 10 minutes, while estimates from the United States-based Joint Typhoon Warning Center are sustained over 1 minute. 10 minute winds are about 1.14 times the amount of 1 minute winds.) Based on this, the JTWC upgraded the depression into a tropical storm and named it Nancy. Initially, the JTWC expected the system to track northwards and eventually re-curve, but this did not occur. Nancy maintained its intensity for 24 hours while tracking westward before rapidly turning west due to a change in steering patterns. Meanwhile, the Philippine Atmospheric, Geophysical and Astronomical Services Administration also monitored the storm and assigned it with the local name Weling. Midday on October 12, the JMA upgraded Nancy into a severe tropical storm. At 00:00 UTC on October 13, the same agency classified Nancy into a typhoon, and subsequently, the storm developed a well-defined eye. Later that day, the JTWC followed suit. By midday on October 14, the JTWC predicted Nancy to turn northwest into China due to the anticipation of a mid-latitude trough south of South Korea deepening. At 0600 UTC, the JMA reported that Nancy reached its peak intensity of 185 km/h (115 mph) and a minimum pressure of 935 mbar (27.6 inHg). Meanwhile, the JTWC reported peak intensity of 215 km/h (130 mph), a Category 4 hurricane equivalent on the United States–based Saffir-Simpson Hurricane Wind Scale (SSHWS). Six hours later, Typhoon Nancy moved ashore in northern Luzon while still at peak intensity.

The storm rapidly weakened over land, with satellite images showing that the eye had quickly disappeared. Although the JTWC downgraded Nancy to a tropical storm, the JMA kept the storm at typhoon intensity throughout landfall. After entering the South China Sea, the storm initially tracked west-northwest before slowing down and turning west. Meanwhile, JTWC upped Nancy to typhoon status as it entered an area with favorable mid- to upper-level winds. Continuing to gain strength, the JMA raised the intensity of Nancy to 130 km/h (80 mph) on October 16. Shortly thereafter, Nancy crossed Hainan Island. After weakening slightly overland, the storm resumed strengthening once offshore. According to the JMA, Nancy attained a secondary peak, with winds of 135 km/h (85 mph) at 06:00 UTC on October 17. The tropical cyclone moved on a slow northwesterly track along the southern periphery of the ridge. While passing slightly north of the Paracel Islands, the JTWC estimated winds of 145 km/h (90 mph), equivalent to a high-end Category 1 hurricane on the SSHWS. Late on October 18, Nancy made landfall along the coast of Vietnam, just north of Vinh. At the time of landfall, both agencies estimated that Nancy was a typhoon. Within hours, the convection ceased, though the JMA kept monitoring the system until October 20, when it finally dissipated.

== Impact ==
Prior to Nancy's first landfall, typhoon warnings were issued for much of Luzon and many residents left for shelter. The typhoon passed through 10 provinces in the Philippines, resulting in widespread destruction. Damage was the worst in Cagayan and Isabela, where 56 people were hurt. In the former, 4,378 dwellings were destroyed. In Isabela, 2,250 houses were destroyed, displacing 35,744 residents. Along a river in Isabela, ten bodies were found. Elsewhere, 800 homes were destroyed in Tuguegarao, leaving 1,000 homeless and two injured. In Kalinga-Apayao, four fatalities occurred. Throughout the nation, many roads were closed due to mudslides. There was significant destruction across rice fields, as well as tobacco and cotton plantations. The typhoon caused $56 million (1982 USD) in damage, which included $18 million from infrastructure and $26 million from agriculture. A total of 96 people died; 81 of the fatalities occurred in three provinces. Most of the deaths were by drowning. Thirty others were rendered as missing and 186 people were injured. A total of 12,464 dwellings were destroyed while 34,111 others were damaged. Furthermore, 301,431 people, or 51,532 families sought shelter due to the storm. However, another source stated that at least 309 people died in the Philippines due to Nancy's impacts.

While making landfall in central Vietnam, winds of 140 km/h (85 mph) were measured due to the typhoon. A total of 71 persons perished, 290 were injured. Around 72,000 homes were destroyed. Moreover, 194,000 people were left homeless, including 125,000 people in Vinh. In all, 450,000 acres (182,110 ha) of rice were destroyed; approximately 150,000 acres (60,705 ha) of rice were submerged in the Thanh Hóa province alone. In addition, many houses were submerged in Nghe Tinhe. Bình Trị Thiên was also affected by Nancy, but no casualties occurred there. Further north, the storm came close enough to Hong Kong to prompt a No 1. hurricane signal. All signals were dropped on October 16. A minimum pressure of 1009.4 mbar (29.81 inHg) was recorded at the Hong Kong Royal Observatory (HKO) on the October 15. Waglan Island recorded a peak wind speed of 48 km/h (30 mph). Meanwhile, Green Island observed a peak wind gust of 78 km/h (48 mph). Tate's Cairn observed a mere .2 mm (0.0079 in) of rain during the passage of the storm, and only cloudy skies with scattered showers were observed throughout the vicinity of Hong Kong.

== See also ==
- Typhoon Nalgae (2011)
- Typhoon Vera (1983)
- Typhoon Koppu
