= 118th meridian west =

Line of longitude

118th meridian west

The meridian 118° west of Greenwich is a line of longitude that extends from the North Pole across the Arctic Ocean, North America, the Pacific Ocean, the Southern Ocean, and Antarctica to the South Pole.

118°W is the Sixth Meridian of the Dominion Land Survey in Canada.

The 118th meridian west forms a great circle with the 62nd meridian east.

== From Pole to Pole ==
Starting at the North Pole and heading south to the South Pole, the 118th meridian west passes through:

Co-ordinates	Country, territory or sea	Notes
90°0′N 118°0′W	Arctic Ocean	
77°22′N 118°0′W	Canada	Northwest Territories — Prince Patrick Island
76°24′N 118°0′W	Crozier Channel	
76°3′N 118°0′W	Canada	Northwest Territories — Eglinton Island
75°42′N 118°0′W	Kellett Strait	
75°20′N 118°0′W	M'Clure Strait	
74°17′N 118°0′W	Canada	Northwest Territories — Banks Island
72°53′N 118°0′W	Prince of Wales Strait	
72°40′N 118°0′W	Canada	Northwest Territories — Victoria Island
71°22′N 118°0′W	Minto Inlet	
71°7′N 118°0′W	Canada	Northwest Territories — Victoria Island
70°47′N 118°0′W	Amundsen Gulf	
69°1′N 118°0′W	Canada	Nunavut; Northwest Territories — from 67°11′N 118°0′W, passing through the Great Bear Lake; Alberta — from 60°0′N 118°0′W; British Columbia — from 52°30′N 118°0′W
49°0′N 118°0′W	United States	Washington; Oregon — from 46°0′N 118°0′W; Nevada — from 42°0′N 118°0′W; California — from 37°36′N 118°0′W, passing just east of Los Angeles (at 34°3′N 118°15′W)
33°39′N 118°0′W	Pacific Ocean	Passing just east of Santa Catalina Island, California United States (at 33°19′N 118°18′W); Passing just east of San Clemente Island, California United States (at 32°49′N 118°21′W); Passing just east of Guadalupe Island, Mexico (at 29°0′N 118°18′W)
60°0′S 118°0′W	Southern Ocean	
73°48′S 118°0′W	Antarctica	Unclaimed territory

== See also ==
- 117th meridian west
- 119th meridian west
