= 1982–83 South Pacific cyclone season =

Tropical cyclone season

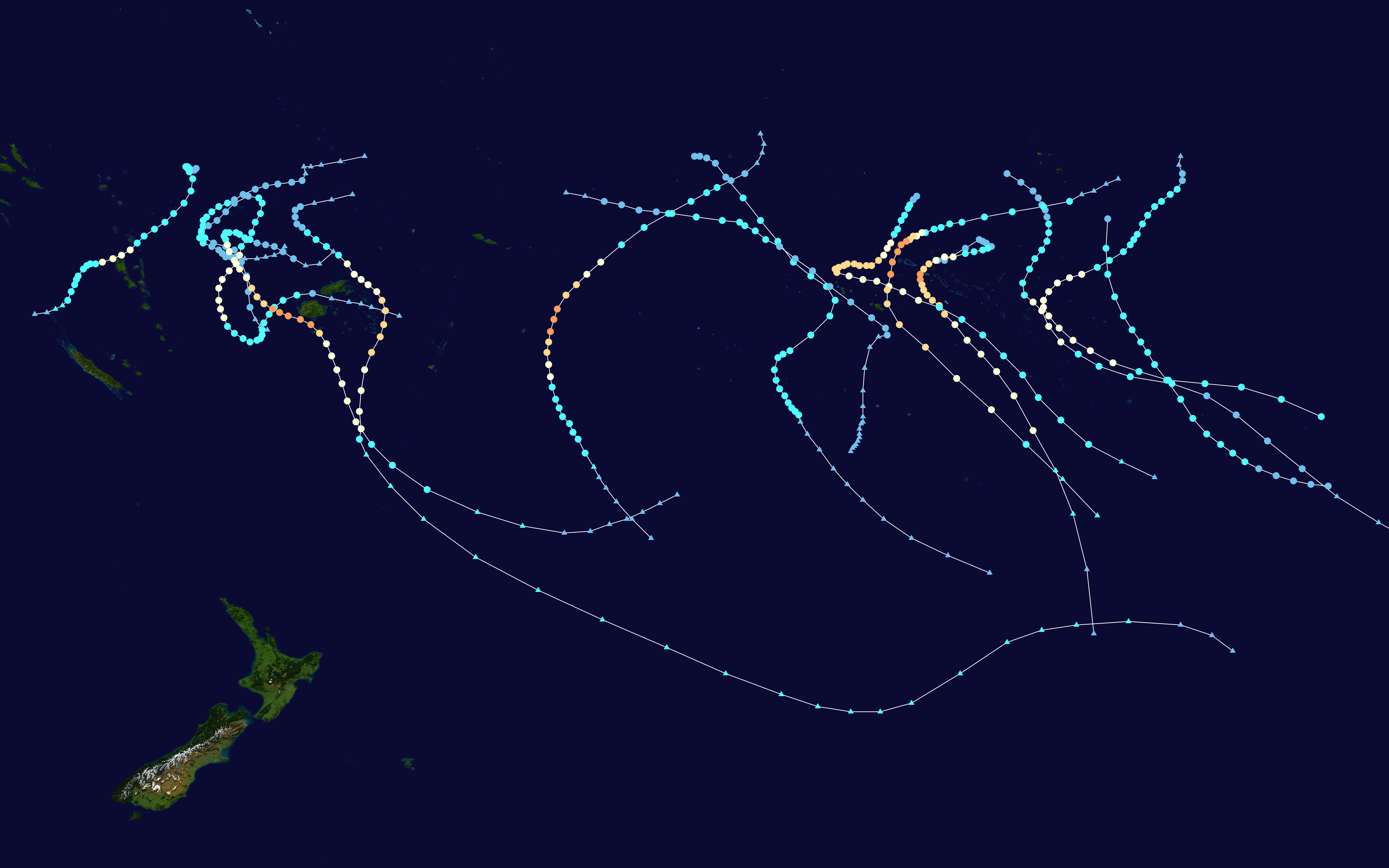
- Season summary map

Seasonal boundaries
- First system formed: October 30, 1982
- Last system dissipated: May 16, 1983

Strongest storm
- Name: Oscar
  - Maximum winds: 205 km/h (125 mph) (10-minute sustained)
  - Lowest pressure: 920 hPa (mbar)

Seasonal statistics
- Total depressions: 14, 2 unofficial
- Tropical cyclones: 14, 1 unofficial
- Severe tropical cyclones: 9
- Total fatalities: ≥18
- Total damage: > $232 million (1983 USD)

Related articles
- 1982–83 South-West Indian Ocean cyclone season; 1982–83 Australian region cyclone season

The 1982–83 South Pacific cyclone season was one of the most active and longest South Pacific tropical cyclone seasons on record, with 14 tropical cyclones occurring within the South Pacific basin between 160°E and 120°W. During the season tropical cyclones were monitored by the meteorological services of Australia, Fiji, French Polynesia and New Zealand. The United States Armed Forces through the Joint Typhoon Warning Center (JTWC) and Naval Pacific Meteorology and Oceanography Center (NPMOC), also monitored the basin and issued unofficial warnings for American interests. The first tropical cyclone of the season developed a day before the season officially began on October 30, while the last tropical cyclone of the season dissipated on May 16. Most of the activity during the season occurred within the far eastern parts of the basin with French Polynesia affected by an extremely high amount of storms.

== Seasonal summary ==
The 1982–83 season was one of the most active and longest South Pacific tropical cyclone seasons on record, with fourteen tropical cyclones and nine severe tropical cyclones occurring within the South Pacific basin between 160°E and 120°W. During the season, tropical cyclones were primarily monitored by the Fiji Meteorological Service, which issued high seas and tropical cyclone warnings for the region between the Equator and 25°S, 160°E and 140°W. Tropical cyclones that moved below 25S were monitored by the New Zealand Meteorological Service (NZMS), while those that were located to the west of 160E were monitored by the Australian Bureau of Meteorology as a part of the Australian region. During the season, several tropical cyclones formed to the east of the International Dateline and out towards 120°W, which caused significant problems for the FMS, as the eastern edge of its satellite coverage was restricted to around 155°W. As a result, the FMS were dependent on data from other weather services including the United States Joint Typhoon Warning Centre, the Naval Western Oceanographic Centre, Central Pacific Hurricane Center as well as the Tahiti Meteorological Services. The NZMS also had to take over Fiji's regional responsibilities for a few days, while Severe Tropical Cyclone Oscar impacted Fiji and caused a communications outage.

The season was characterised by a very strong El Niño event, which resulted in eleven tropical cyclones occurring to the east of the International Dateline. Five of these tropical cyclones went on to affect the island nation of French Polynesia, which it was thought had not been affected by a tropical cyclone since another very strong El Niño episode in 1905–06.

During the season, ten of the fourteen tropical cyclones observed to the east of 160 E were severe tropical cyclones, with 5 of them occurring in the French Polynesia region which represented one more than was experienced in the same area over the previous 13 seasons. Damage from the storms in French Polynesia was estimated at F16 billion (US$100 million).

The first tropical disturbance was first by Honolulu on October 30

== Systems ==
=== Tropical Cyclone Joti ===
- Category 2 tropical cyclone (Australian scale)
- Category 1 tropical cyclone (SSHWS)
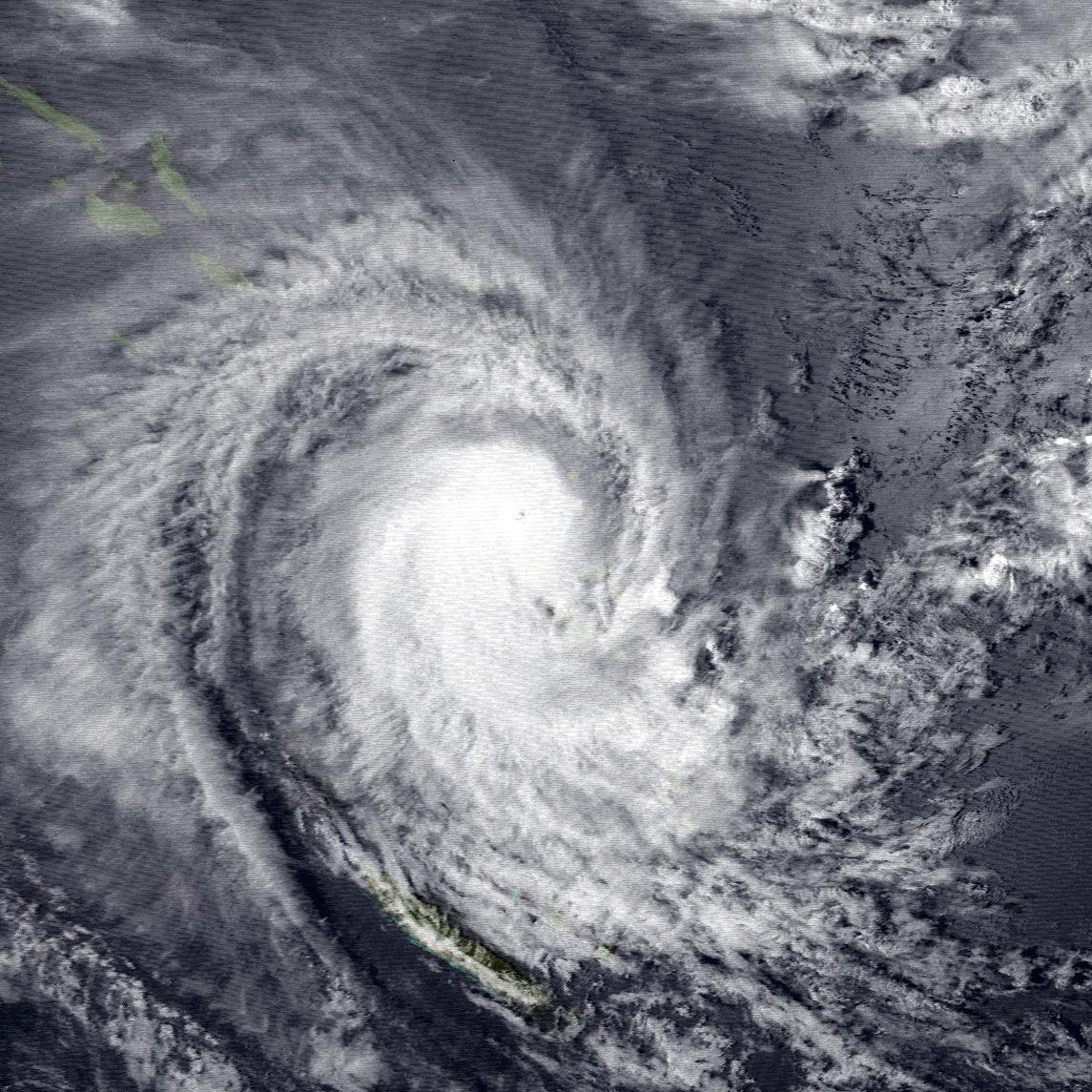
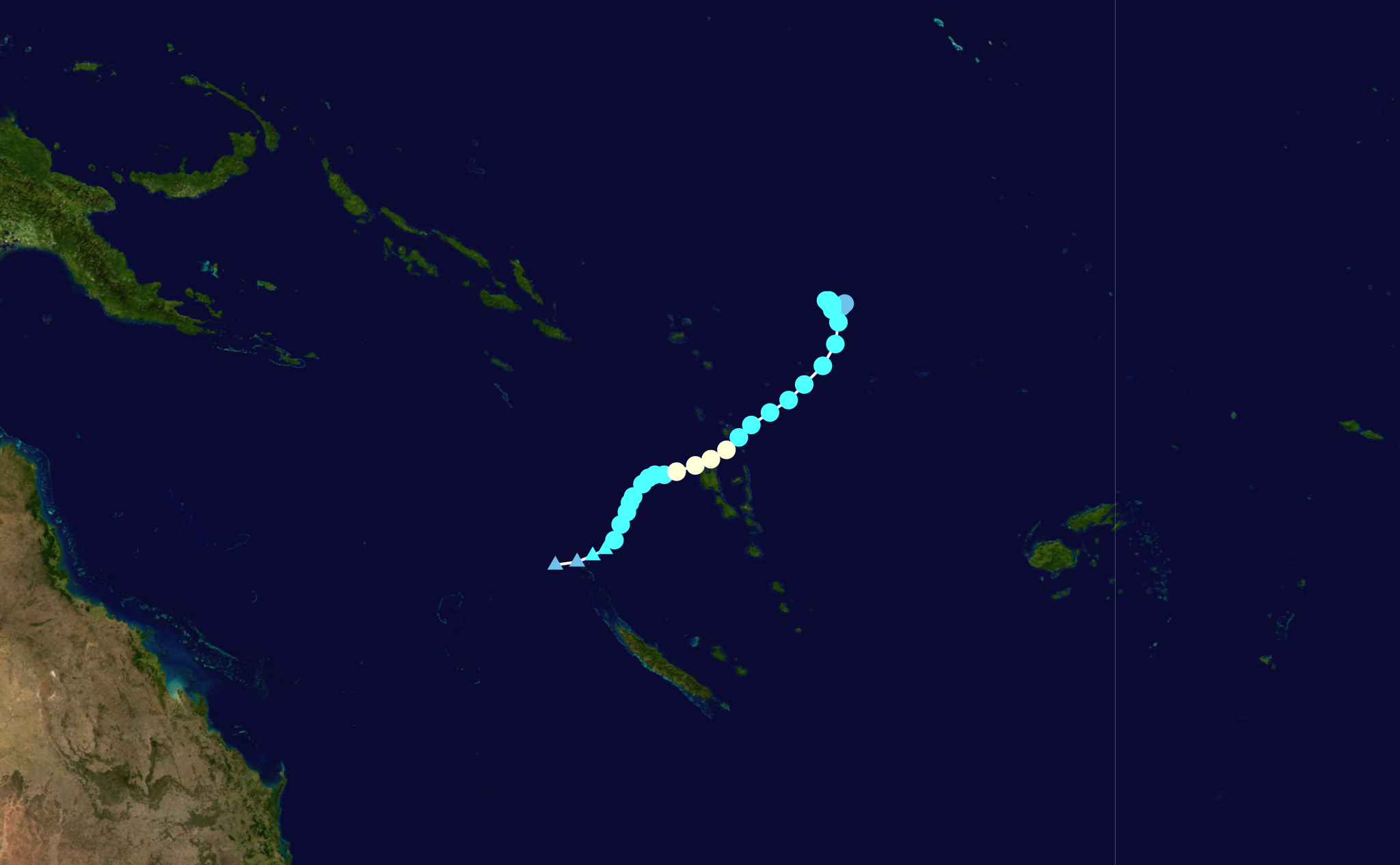
- Duration: October 30 – November 7
- Peak intensity: 110 km/h (70 mph) (10-min); 975 hPa (mbar)

The system that was to become Tropical Cyclone Joti was first noted by the Central Pacific Hurricane Center (CPHC) during October 30, while it was located about 1000 km (620 mi) to the north-east of Port Villa in Vanuatu. Over the next day, the disturbance gradually developed further, as its outflow increased and atmospheric convection surrounding the system organized. The disturbance was subsequently named Joti at 00:00 UTC on November 1, by the FMS as it had developed into a tropical cyclone. After it was named, Joti continued to develop as it completed a cyclonic loop, before the FMS reported that Joti had peaked with 10-minute sustained winds of 110 km/h (70 mph) on November 3, which made it a Category 2 tropical cyclone on the Australian scale. The JTWC subsequently reported that the system had peaked with 1-minute sustained winds of 120 km/h (75 mph), which made it equivalent to a Category 1 hurricane on the SSHWS. During that day the system started to move towards the west-south-west and made landfall on the northern Espiritu Santo. After the system had moved into the Coral Sea, it gradually weakened and turned towards the south-southwest, before it degenerated into a depression during November 7. Within northern Vanuatu, Joti damaged houses, gardens and fruit trees.

=== Tropical Cyclone Kina ===
- Category 1 tropical cyclone (Australian scale)
- Tropical storm (SSHWS)
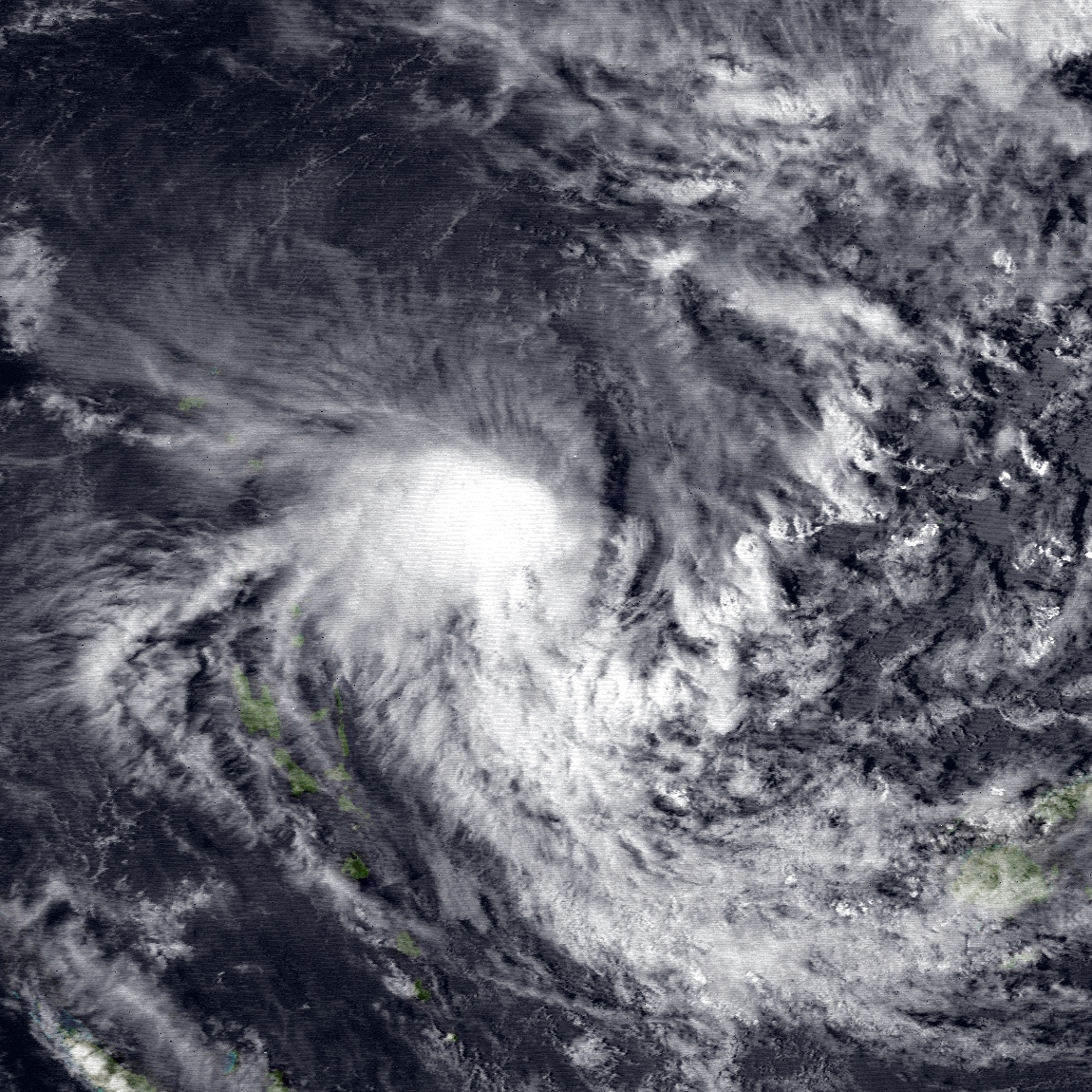
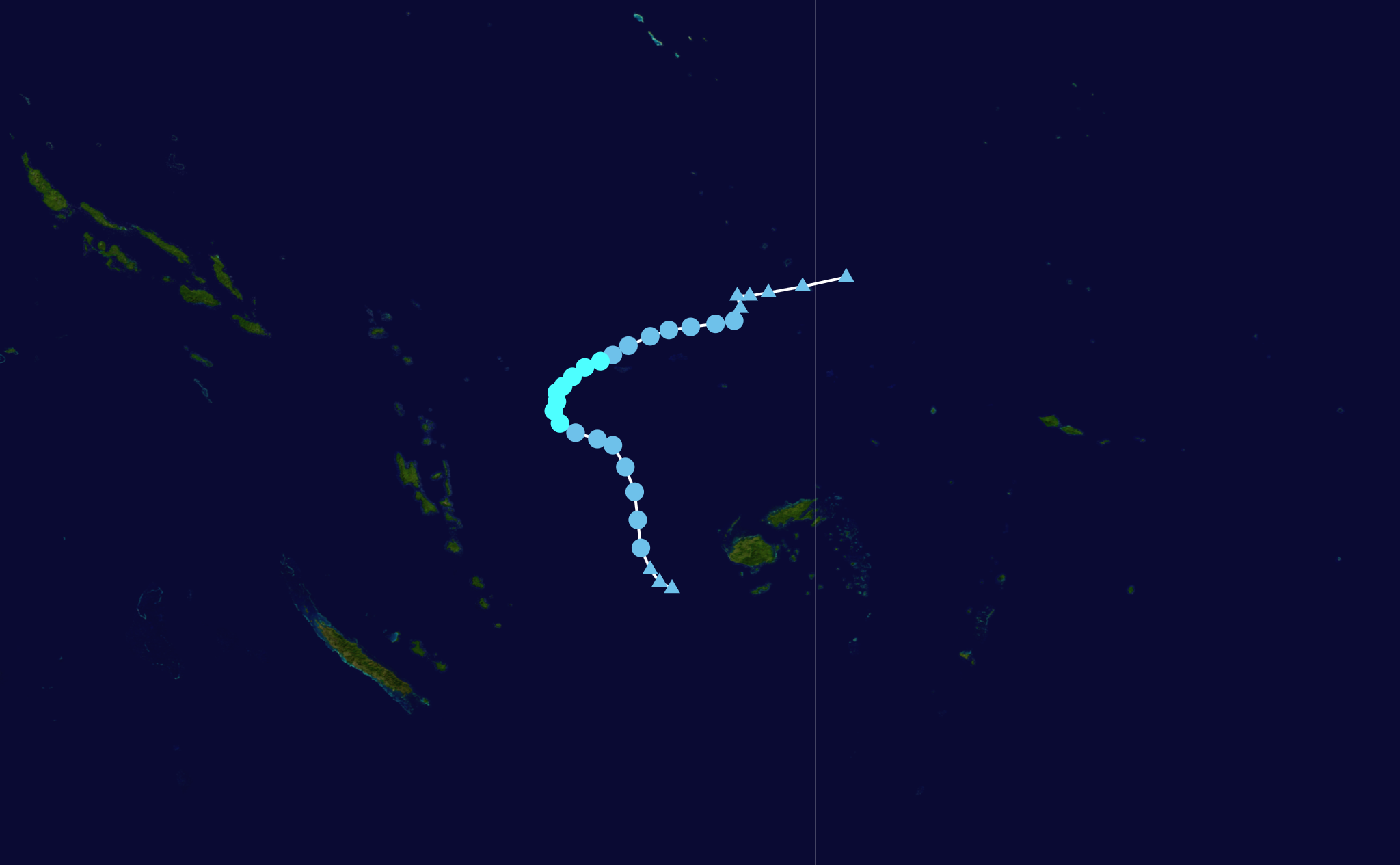
- Duration: November 6 – November 13
- Peak intensity: 75 km/h (45 mph) (10-min); 990 hPa (mbar)

The system that was to become Tropical Cyclone Kina was first noted on November 6, while it was located just to the east of Tuvalu. Over the next few days the system moved south-westwards and gradually developed further, before the JTWC reported that the system had developed into a tropical cyclone, with peak 1-minute sustained winds of 75 km/h (45 mph) during November 10. During that day the FMS also reported that the system had developed into a Category 1 tropical cyclone on the Australian Scale and named it Kina. The FMS subsequently estimated during the next day that the system had reached its peak intensity, with 10-minute sustained winds of 75 km/h (45 mph) during November 11. Later that day the system's upper-level circulation became sheared off from its lower and moved southwards away from it. The degenerating system subsequently passed to the west of Fiji during November 13, before it was last noted during November 16, as it passed over the island of Efate in Vanuatu but no damage was reported. The system caused strong winds and rough seas on Viti Levu and in the Yasawas and Mamanutha group of islands. Tourists on the Blue Lagoon Cruise in the Yasawas were forced to take shelter from Kina, while 18 people on another boat were temporarily listed as missing as they took shelter.

=== Tropical Cyclone Lisa ===
- Category 2 tropical cyclone (Australian scale)
- Tropical storm (SSHWS)
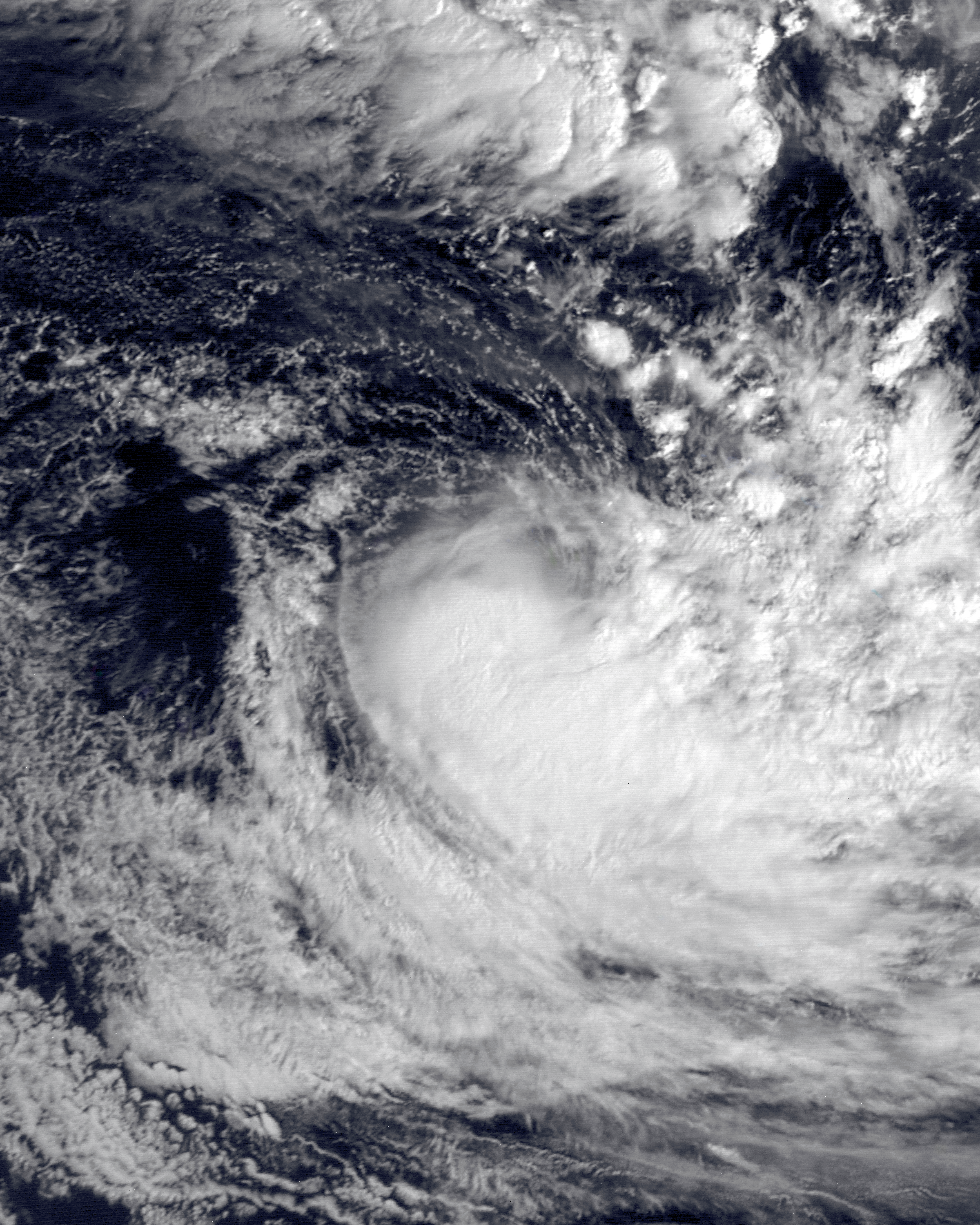
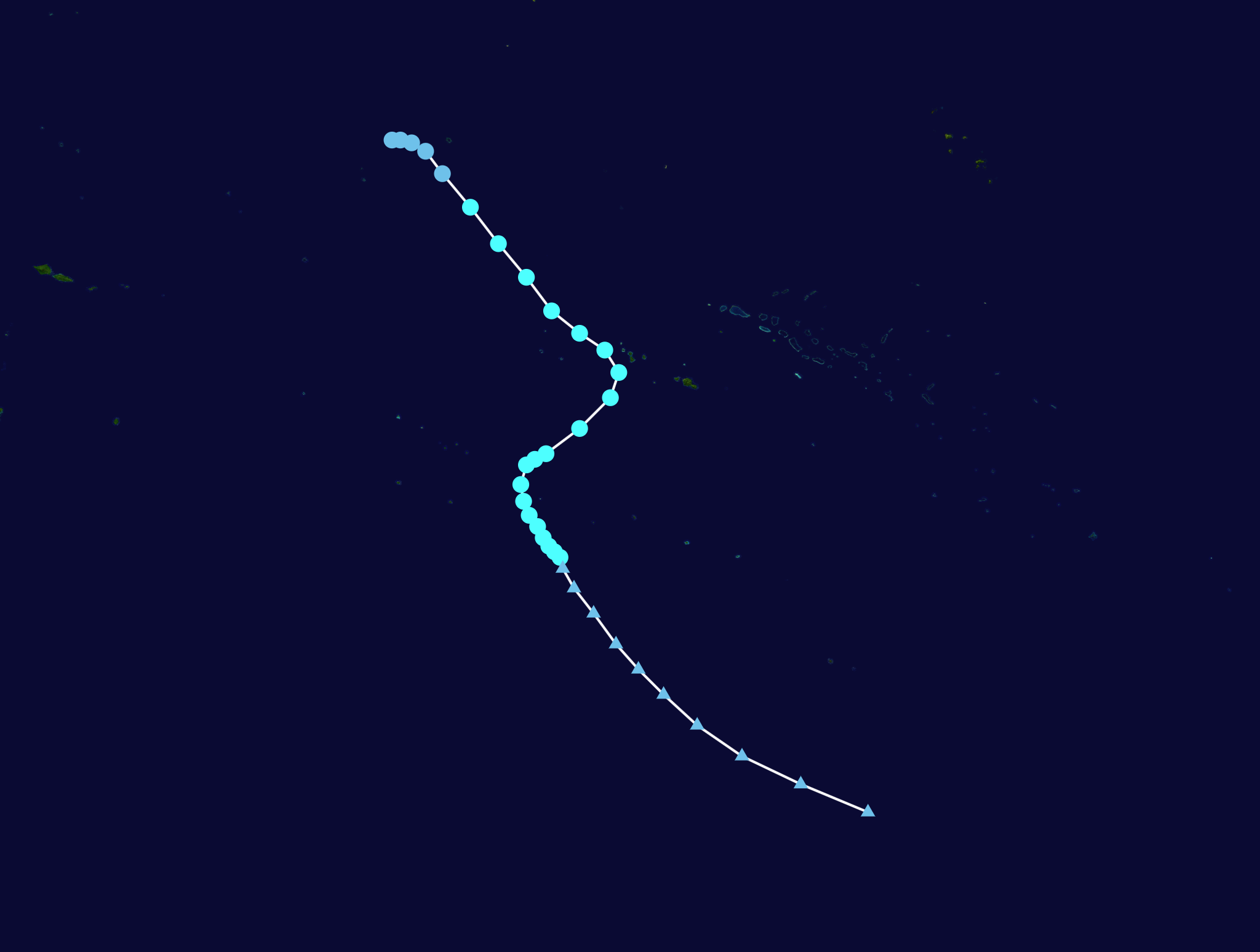
- Duration: December 10 – December 18
- Peak intensity: 110 km/h (70 mph) (10-min); 975 hPa (mbar)

During December 10, a shallow tropical depression formed to the west of the Northern Cook Island of Penrhyn and started to move south-eastwards towards French Polynesia. Over the next couple of days, the system gradually developed further before the FMS reported that the system had developed into a tropical cyclone and named it Lisa during December 12. During that day, gale-force winds were observed on Bora Bora before the system caused gas it passed to

=== Severe Tropical Cyclone Mark ===
- Category 3 severe tropical cyclone (Australian scale)
- Category 1 tropical cyclone (SSHWS)
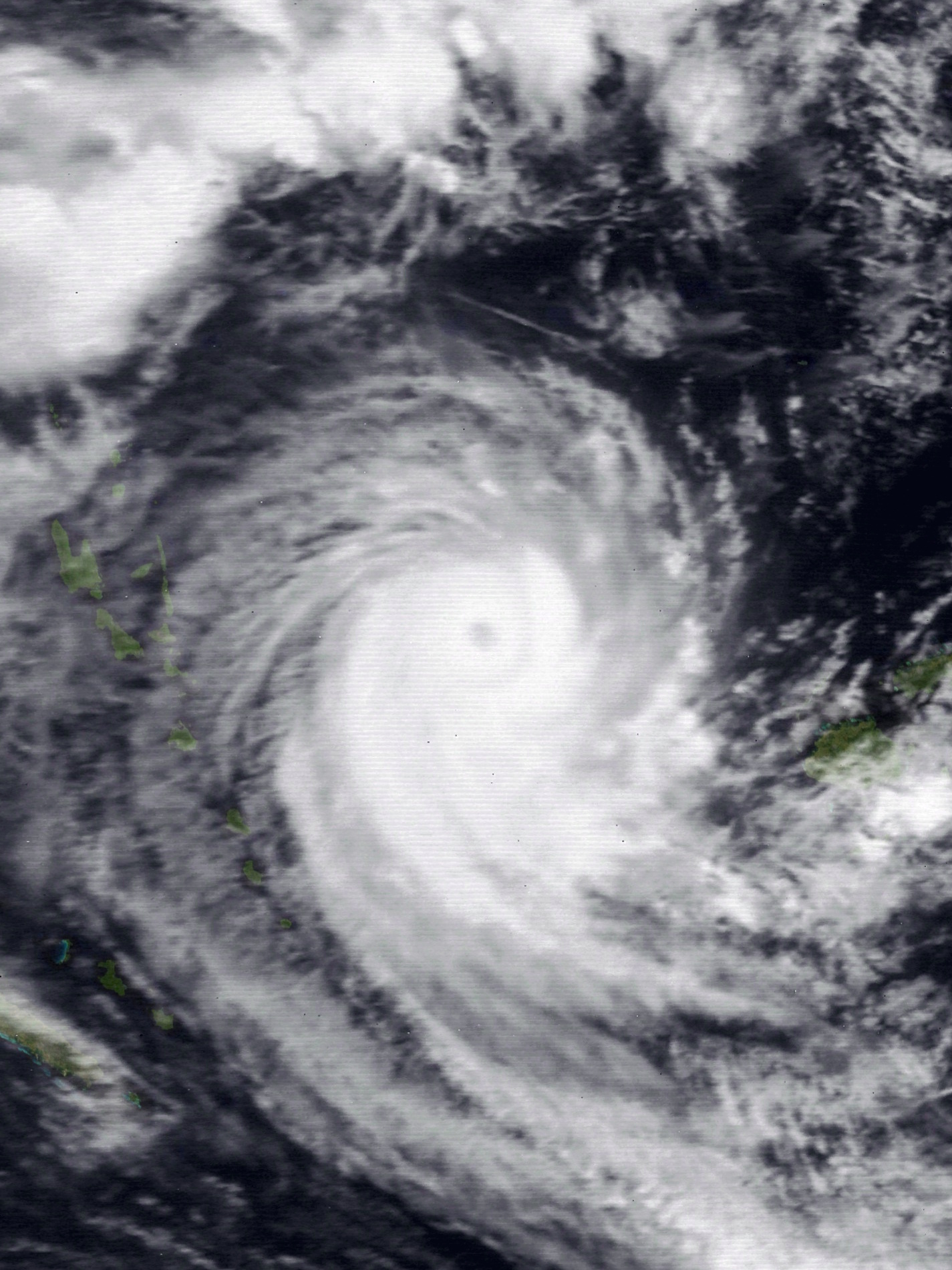
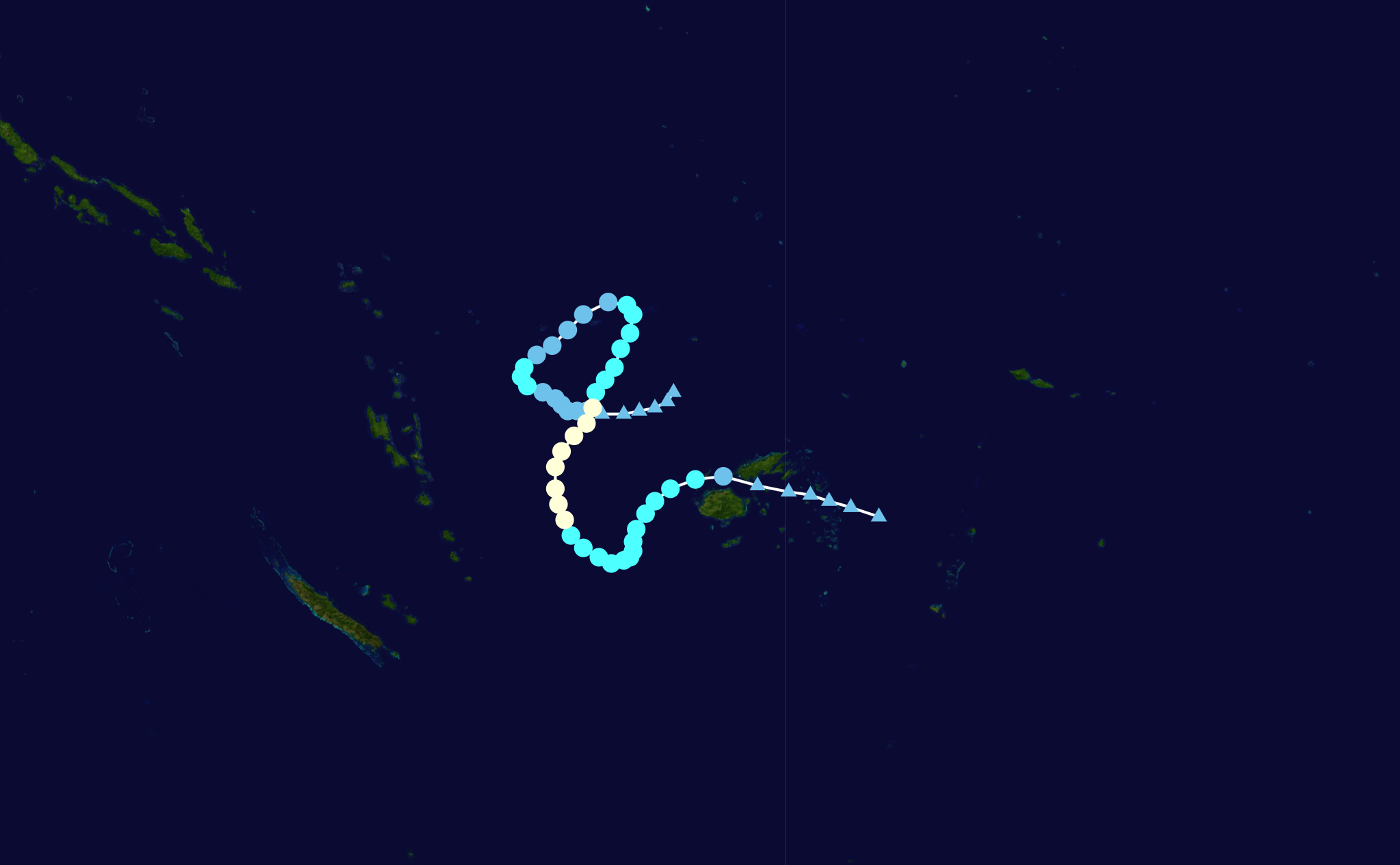
- Duration: January 20 – February 1
- Peak intensity: 150 km/h (90 mph) (10-min); 955 hPa (mbar)

Cyclone Mark existed from January 20 to February 1, taking an erratic and unusual track. Mark peaked as a Category 3 cyclone on the Australian Scale.

=== Severe Tropical Cyclone Nano ===
- Category 3 severe tropical cyclone (Australian scale)
- Category 1 tropical cyclone (SSHWS)
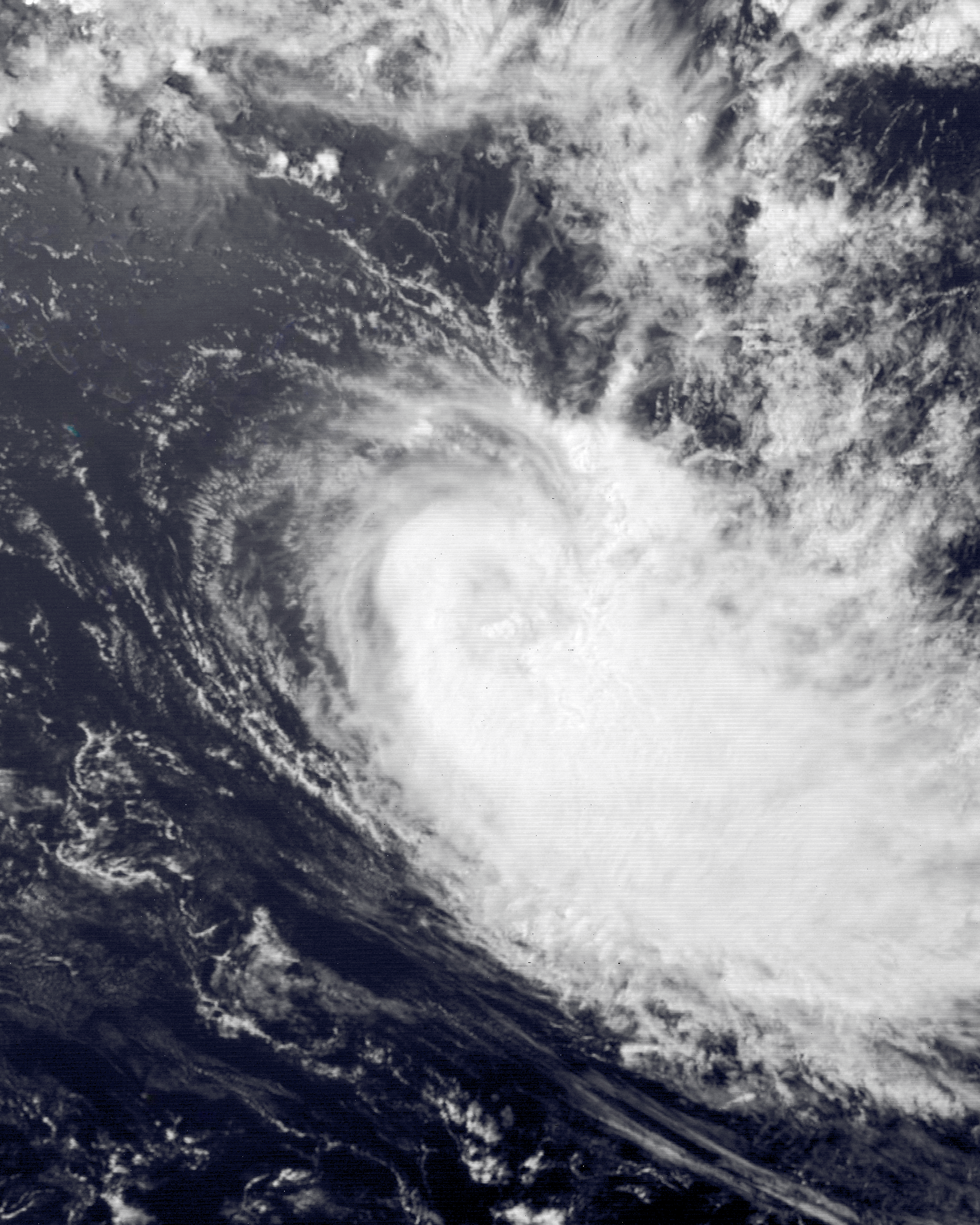
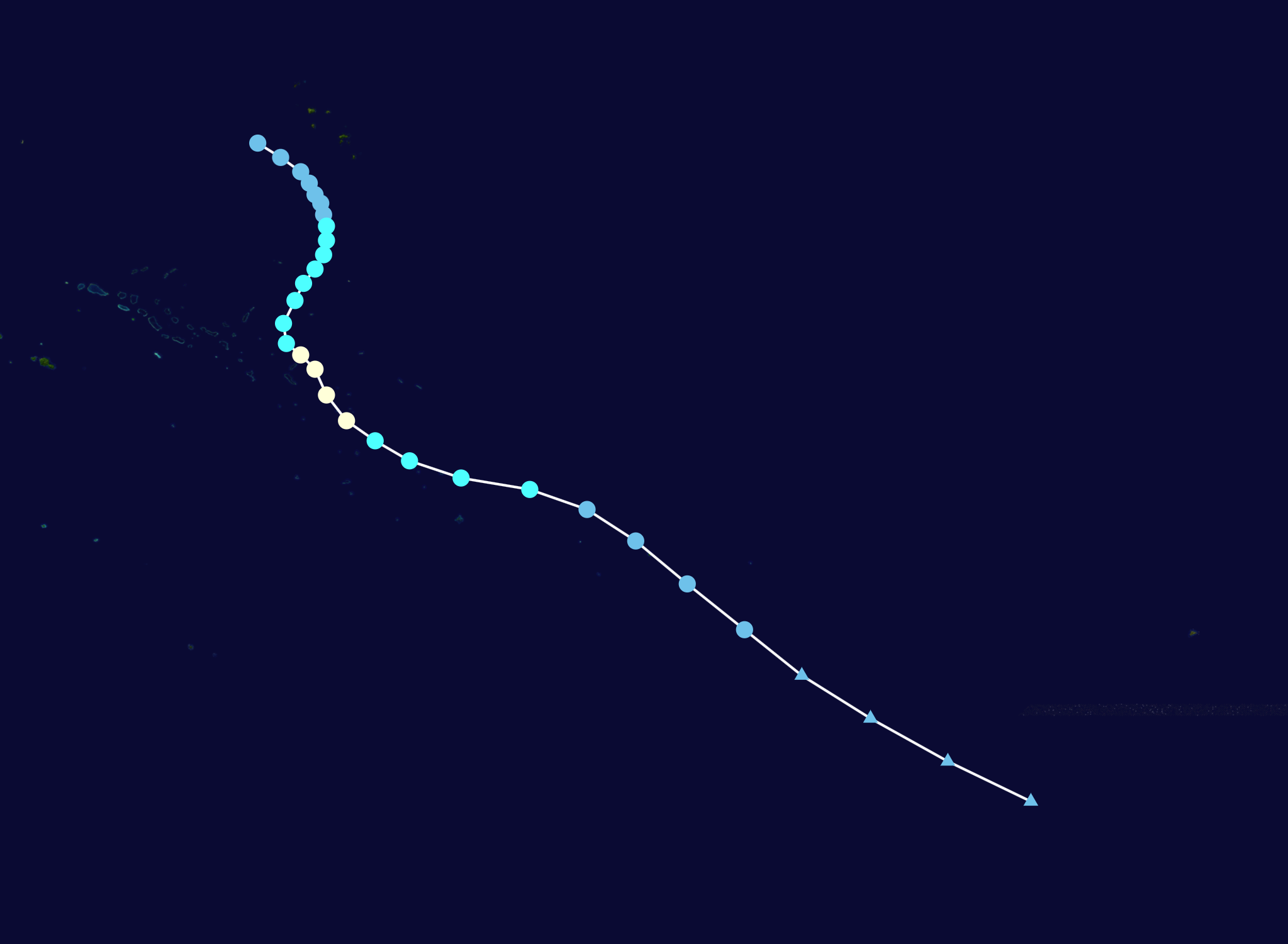
- Duration: January 21 – January 29
- Peak intensity: 120 km/h (75 mph) (10-min); 970 hPa (mbar)

Nano existed from January 21 to January 29. Nano was relatively harmless, and peaked as a Category 3. Nano formed in a remote area of the South Pacific on January 21 and moved south, and dissipated on January 29 in an even more remote area.

=== Severe Tropical Cyclone Nisha–Orama ===
- Category 4 severe tropical cyclone (Australian scale)
- Category 3 tropical cyclone (SSHWS)
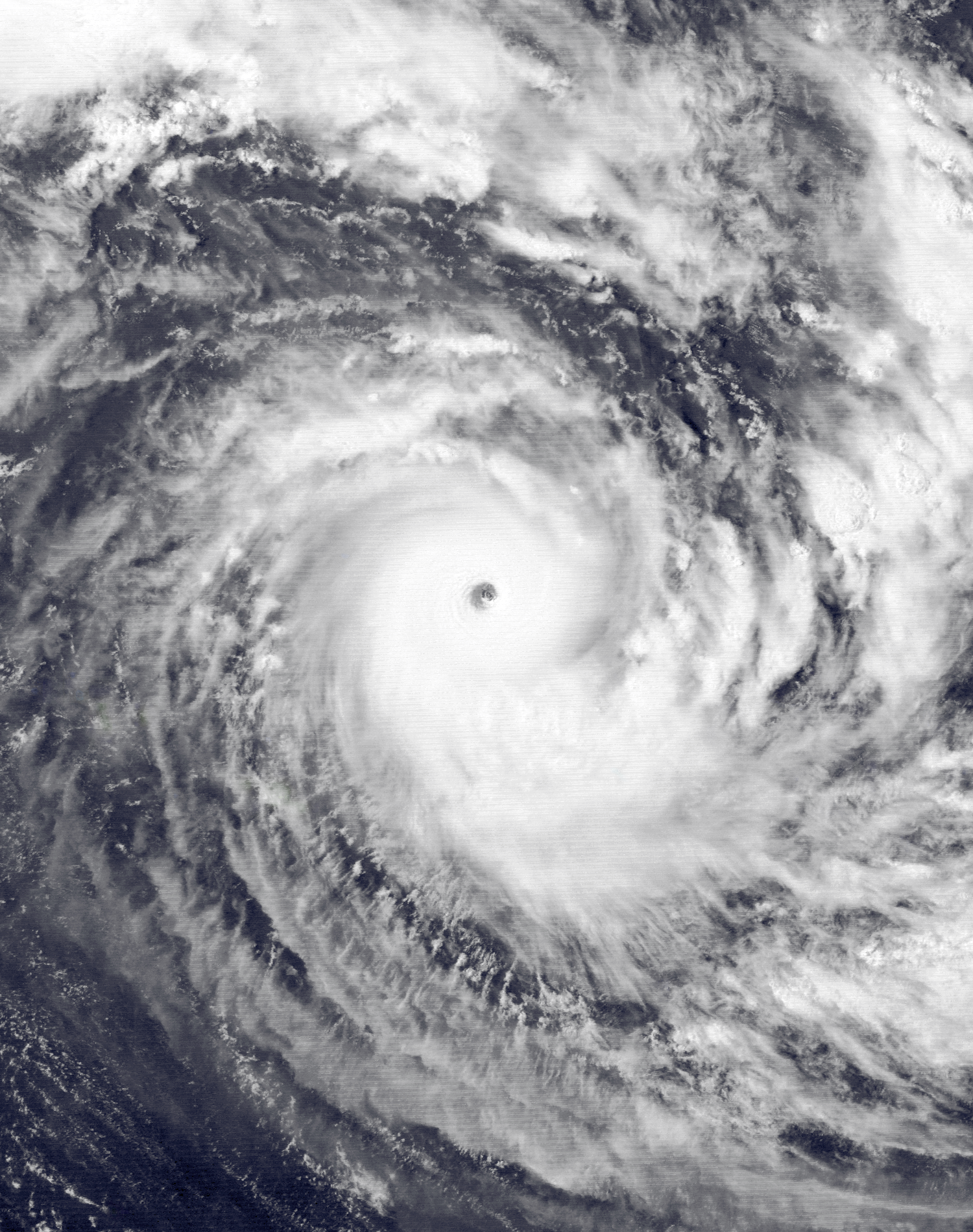
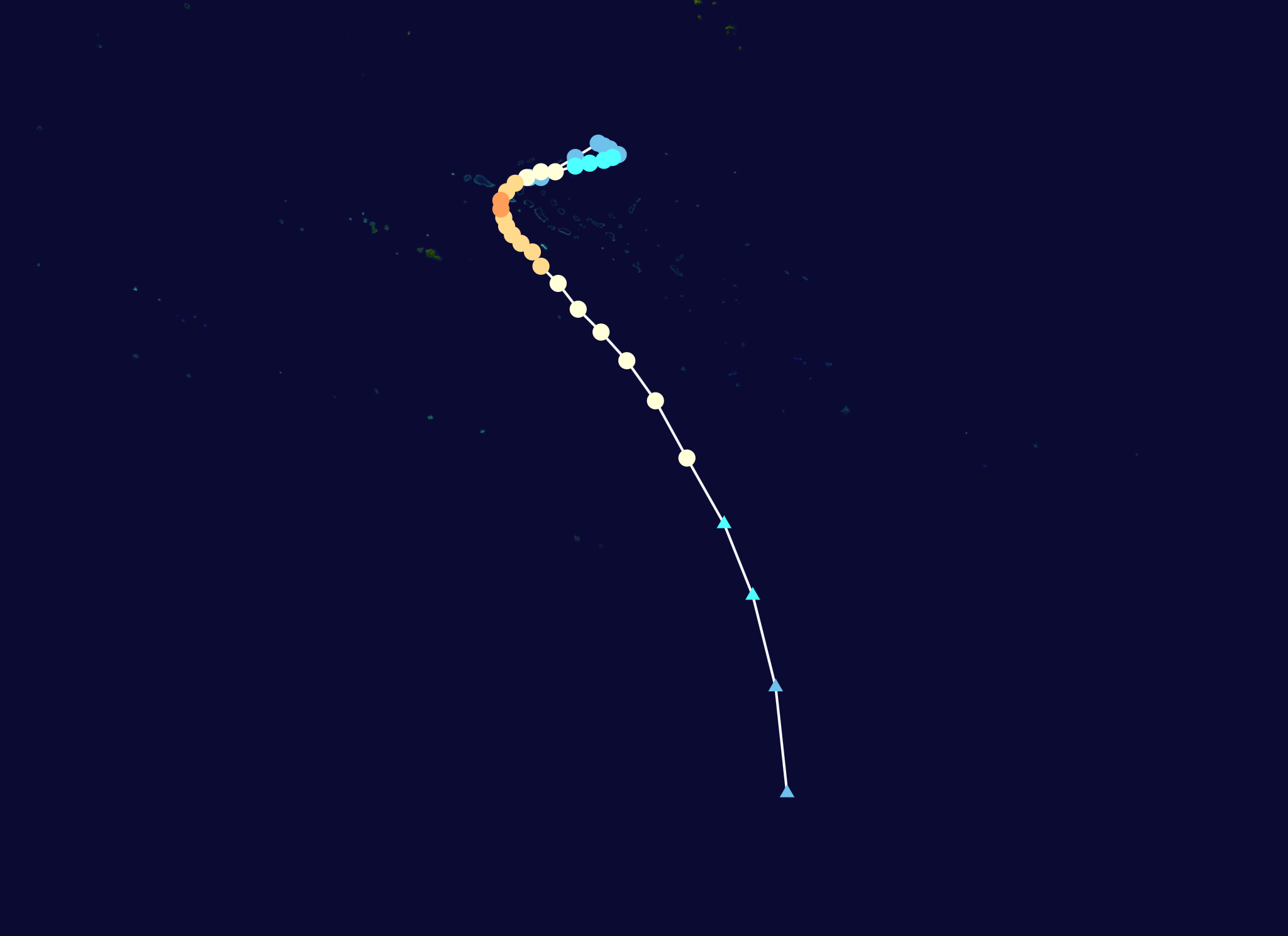
- Duration: February 13 – February 28
- Peak intensity: 185 km/h (115 mph) (10-min); 925 hPa (mbar)

During February 13, a depression developed just to the north of the Marquesas Islands and started moving south-westwards. Over the next four days the system maintained its intensity, before it made a sharp eastwards turn and started to develop further. The system subsequently moved in a counter clockwise loop, which allowed it to develop further and it was declared to be a tropical cyclone and named Nisha by the FMS during February 22. However, by the time Fiji had named it Nisha, the Tahiti Meteorological Service had named it Orama, which was retained in order to save any confusion to the local public. Over the next day, the system started to move south-westwards, while it rapidly intensified, with the FMS estimating 10-minute sustained wind-speeds of 185 km/h (115 mph) during February 24. During that day the system sharply turned south-eastwards and started to gradually weaken, before it was last noted during February 28, as it moved out of the FMS's area of responsibility, while equivalent to a modern-day category 1 tropical cyclone. The Tuamotu Archipelago was the worst hit area with around 30 of its Atolls, either seriously damaged or destroyed with a damage total of around US$1.7 million reported in two villages on Rangiroa.

=== Severe Tropical Cyclone Oscar ===
- Category 4 severe tropical cyclone (Australian scale)
- Category 3 tropical cyclone (SSHWS)
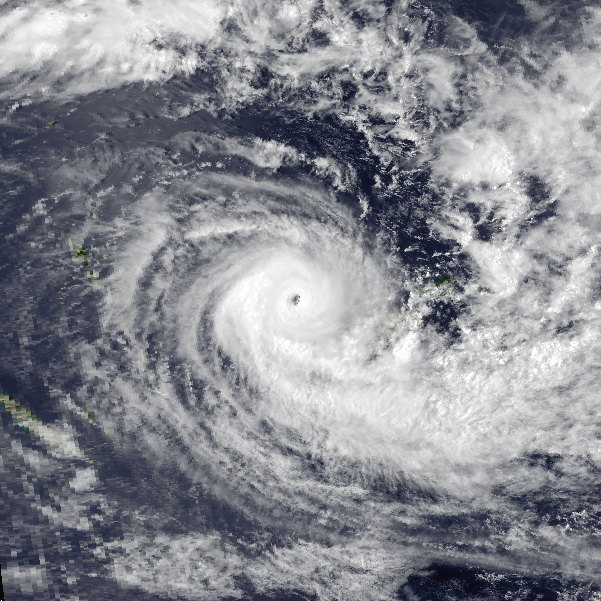
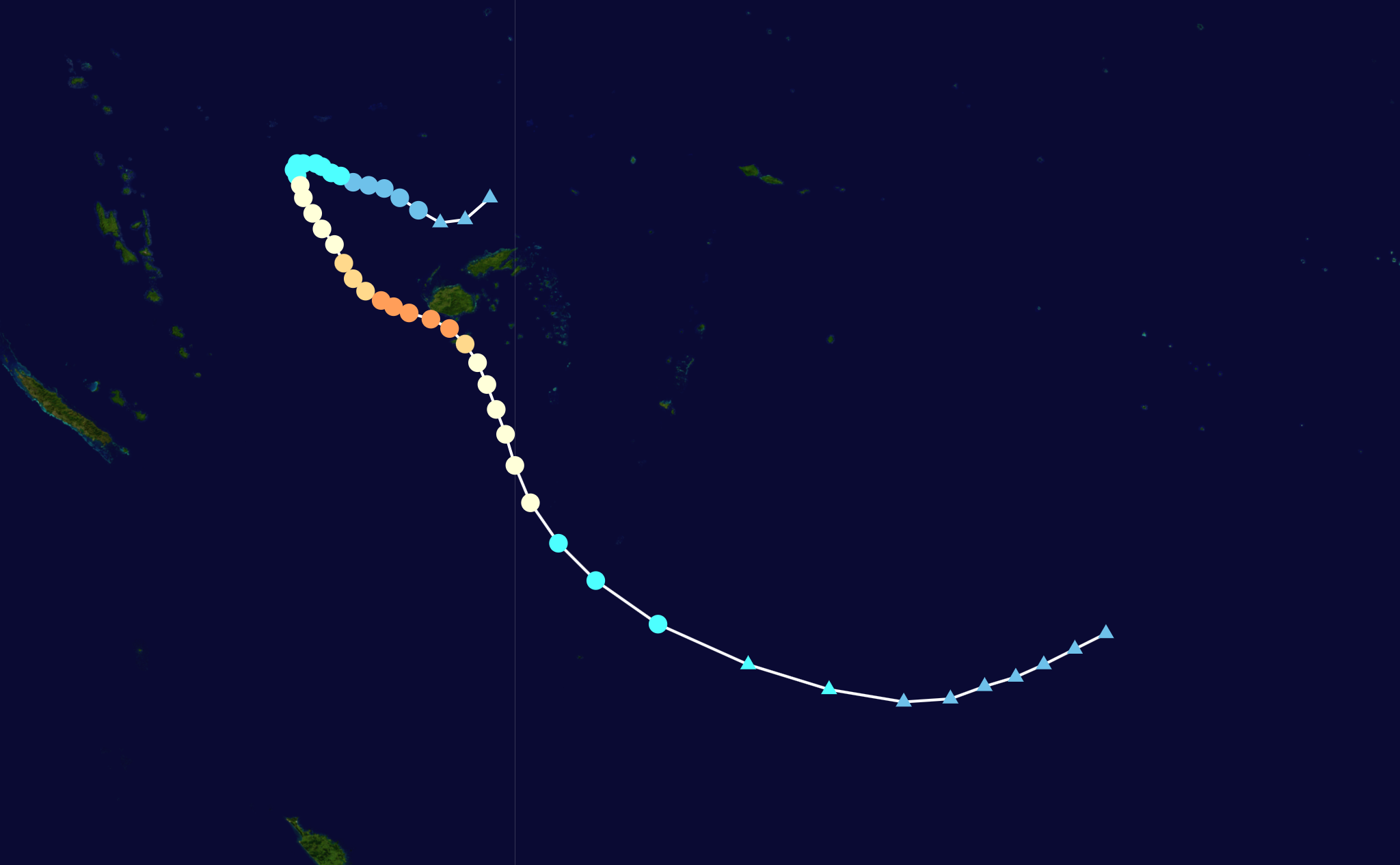
- Duration: February 23 – March 6
- Peak intensity: 185 km/h (115 mph) (10-min); 920 hPa (mbar)

Oscar existed from February 23 to March 6. The system formed as a shallow depression north of Suva and developed and intensified as it moved westwards, strengthening on February 27 to a Category 3 Severe Tropical Cyclone, on the modern day Australian tropical cyclone intensity scale. It then moved south-east towards Fiji, becoming one of the worst tropical cyclones to affect the country. It caused nine deaths and US$130 million in damages. As a result of the impact caused the name Oscar was retired, from the list of tropical cyclone names for the region.

=== Tropical Cyclone Prema ===
- Category 1 tropical cyclone (Australian scale)
- Tropical storm (SSHWS)
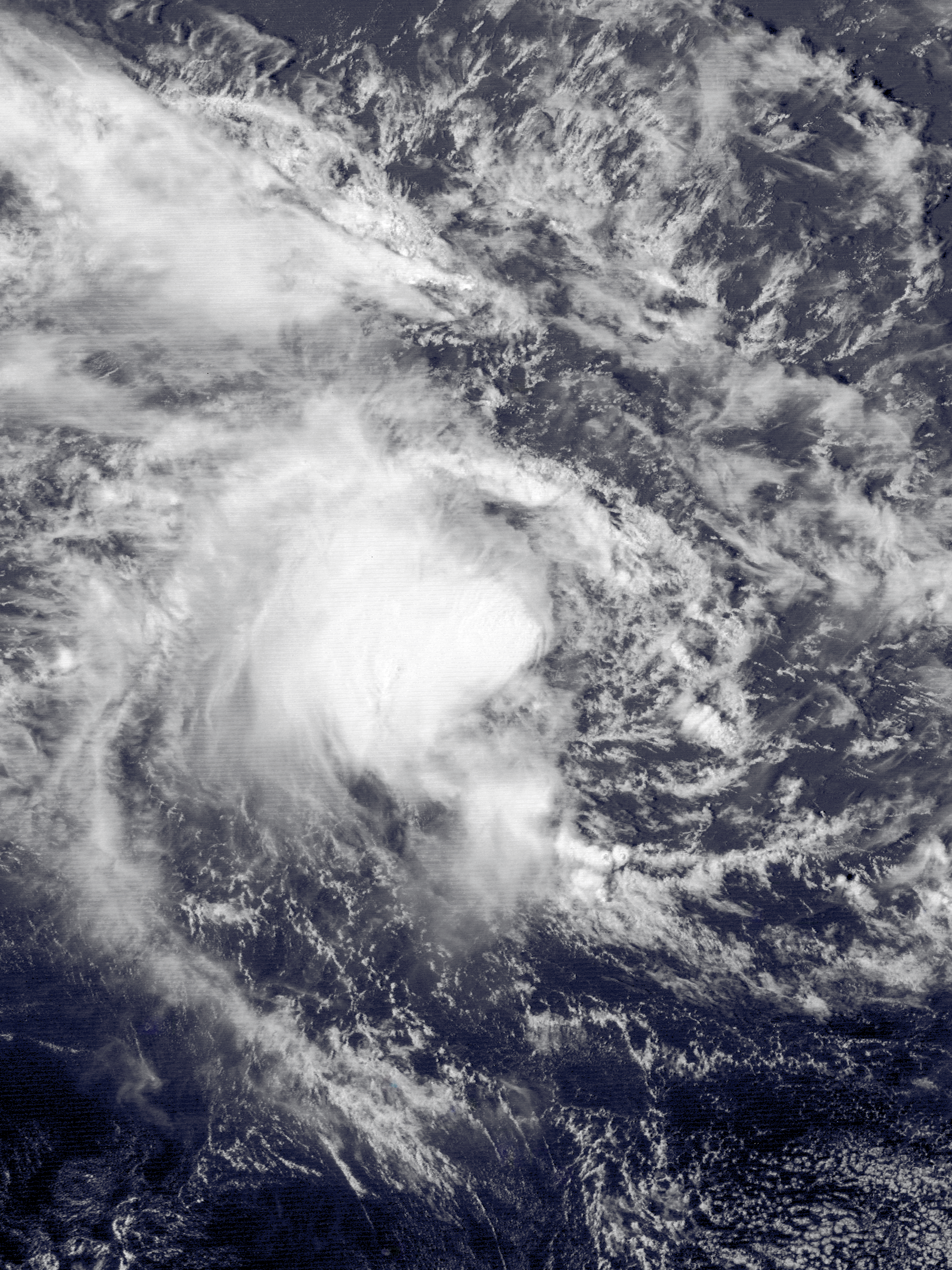
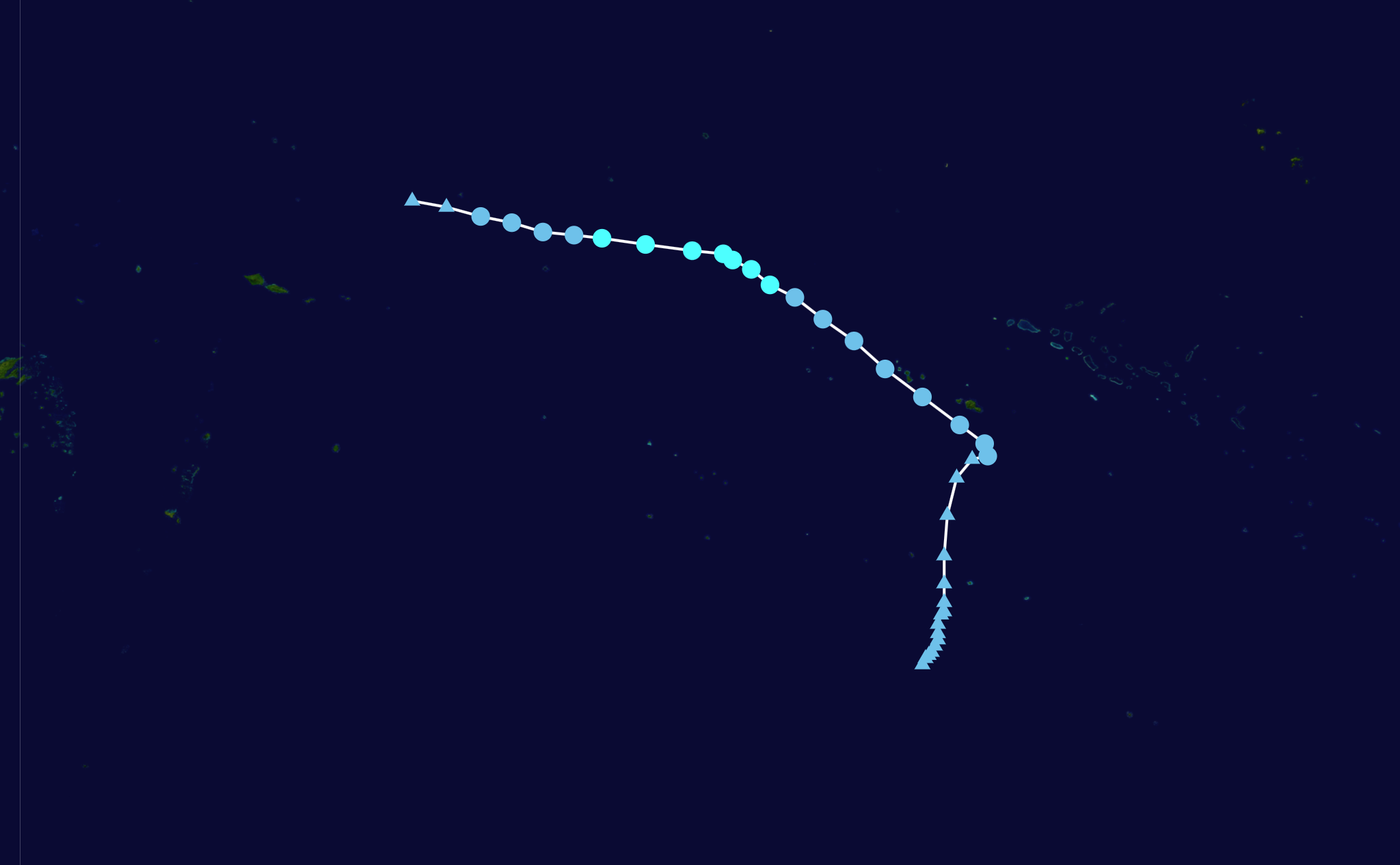
- Duration: February 25 – March 6
- Peak intensity: 85 km/h (50 mph) (10-min); 987 hPa (mbar)

During February 25, a depression developed within a trough of low pressure, to the south-west of Manihiki in the Northern Cook Islands. The system was named Prema by the FMS during the next day, after it had developed into a category 1 tropical cyclone and peaked, with 10-minute sustained winds of 85 km/h (50 mph). After it had been named: Prema moved south-eastwards and started to gradually weaken, before it degenerated into a depression during February 27. The remnants of Prema were subsequently monitored over the next few days, as they moved towards and through French Polynesia, before they were last noted during March 6. Prema brought strong to gale-force winds and high seas to the Northern Cook Islands of Penrhyn, Manihiki, Rakahanga and Pukapula. On the atoll of Manihiki, the high seas reached the settlement, with minor damage to coconut trees reported as a result. Gale-force winds caused some serious damage to a wharf, on the atoll of Penhryn. Heavy rain and gale-force winds of up to 100 km/h (60 mph), caused minor damage to French Polynesia's Leeward and Society Islands.

=== Severe Tropical Cyclone Rewa ===
- Category 4 severe tropical cyclone (Australian scale)
- Category 2 tropical cyclone (SSHWS)
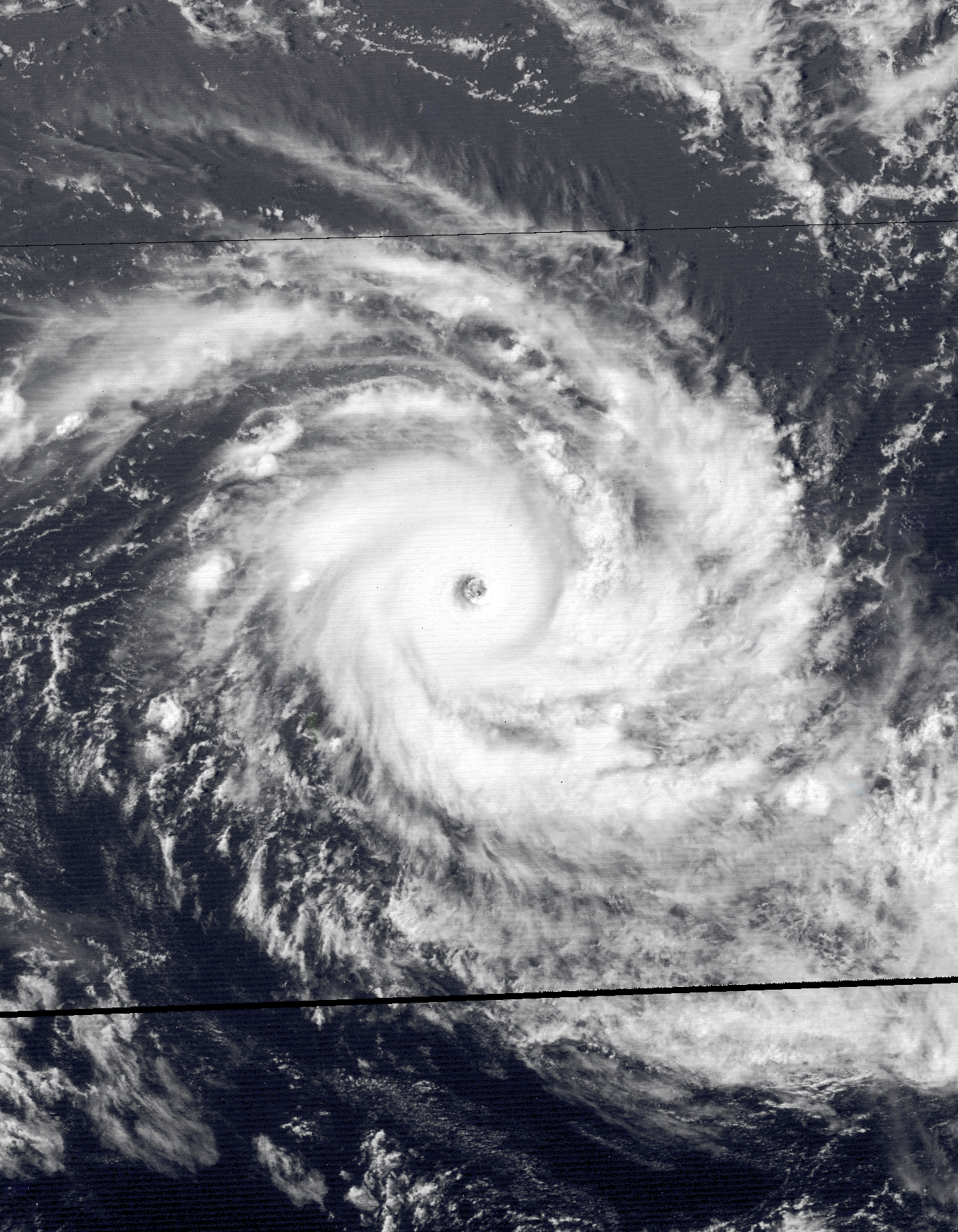
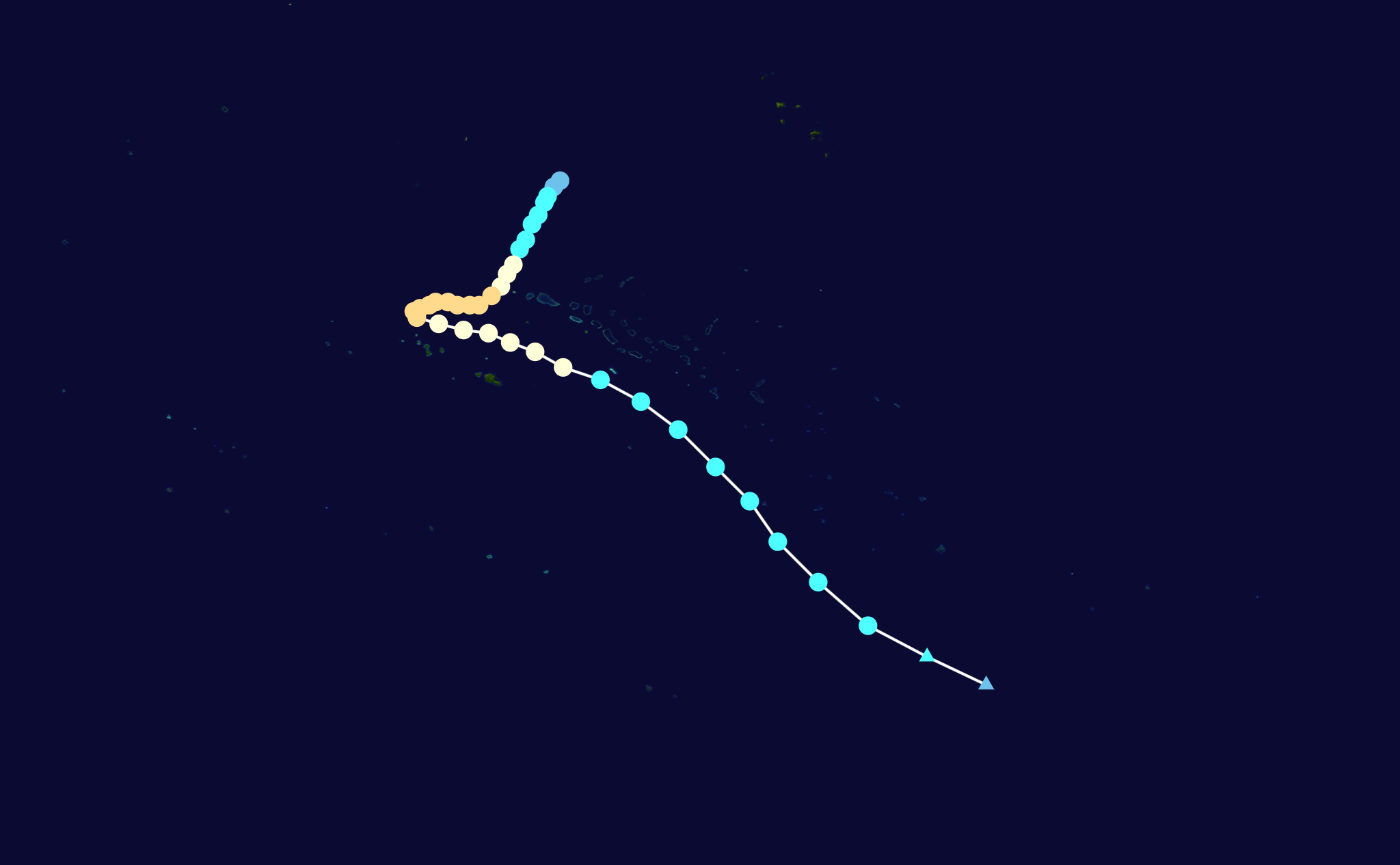
- Duration: March 7 – March 15
- Peak intensity: 185 km/h (115 mph) (10-min); 925 hPa (mbar)

During March 7, a tropical depression developed about 650 km (405 mi) to the northeast of the Society Islands. During that day, the system started to rapidly develop further as it moved and was named Rewa, as it had developed into a Category 1 tropical cyclone.

Rewa exacerbated the destruction caused by Severe Tropical Cyclone Nisha/Orama earlier in the season and destroyed more than 200 houses.

=== Tropical Cyclone Saba ===
- Category 2 tropical cyclone (Australian scale)
- Tropical storm (SSHWS)
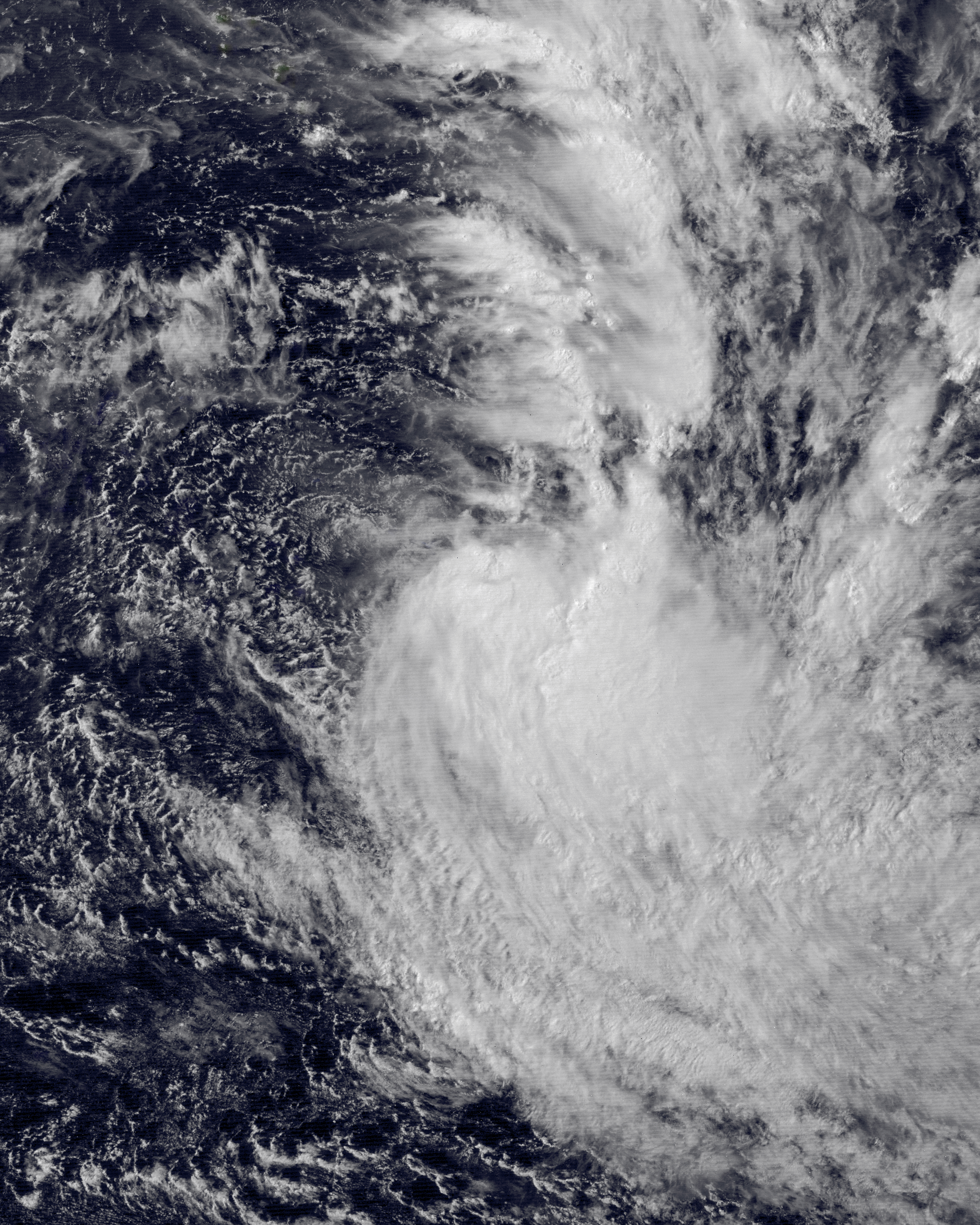
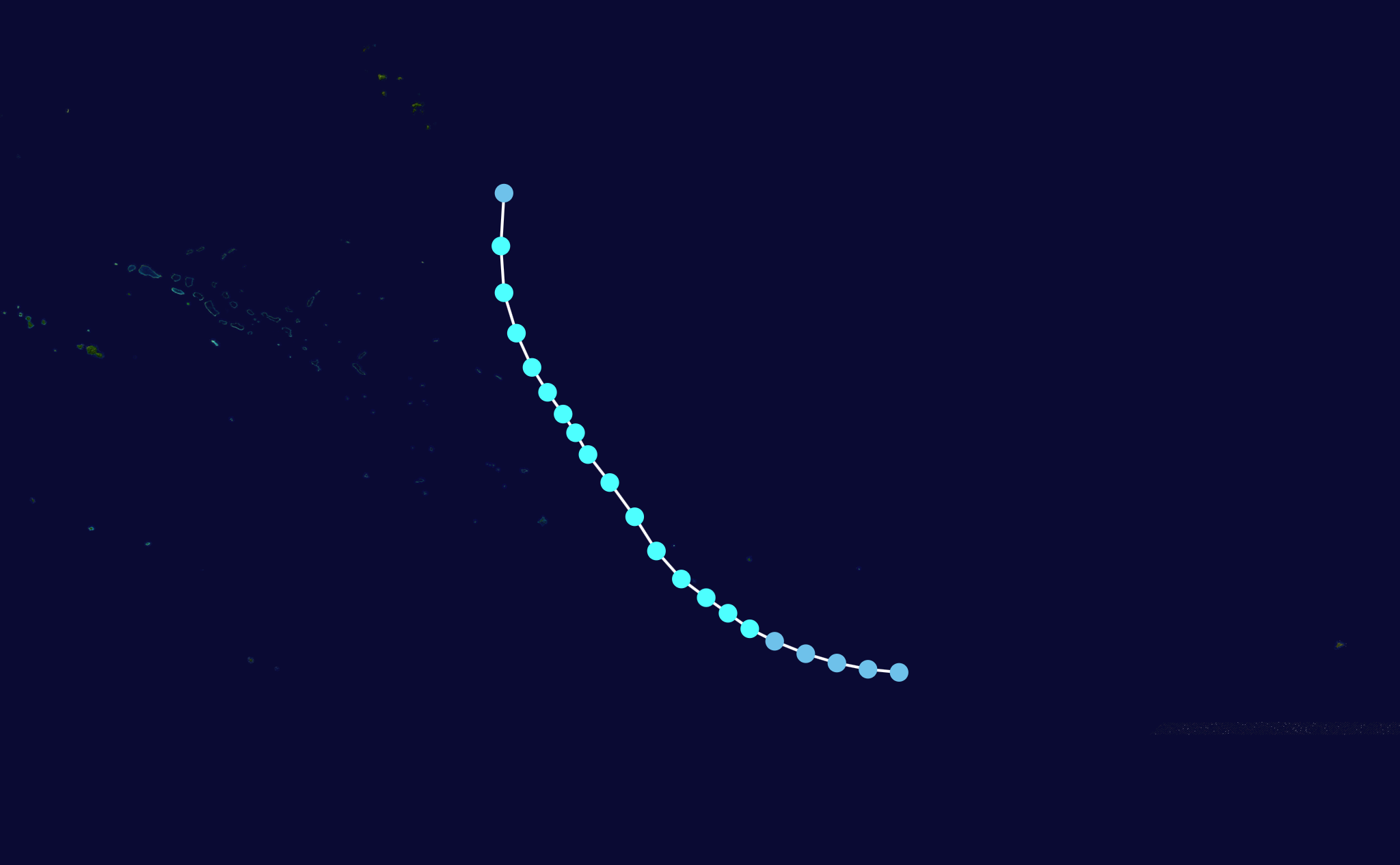
- Duration: March 20 – March 25
- Peak intensity: 95 km/h (60 mph) (10-min); 985 hPa (mbar)

Saba existed from March 20 to March 25. It sustained winds of 60 mph on the Australian scale, and it affected the Pitcairn Islands.

=== Severe Tropical Cyclone Sarah ===
- Category 4 severe tropical cyclone (Australian scale)
- Category 2 tropical cyclone (SSHWS)
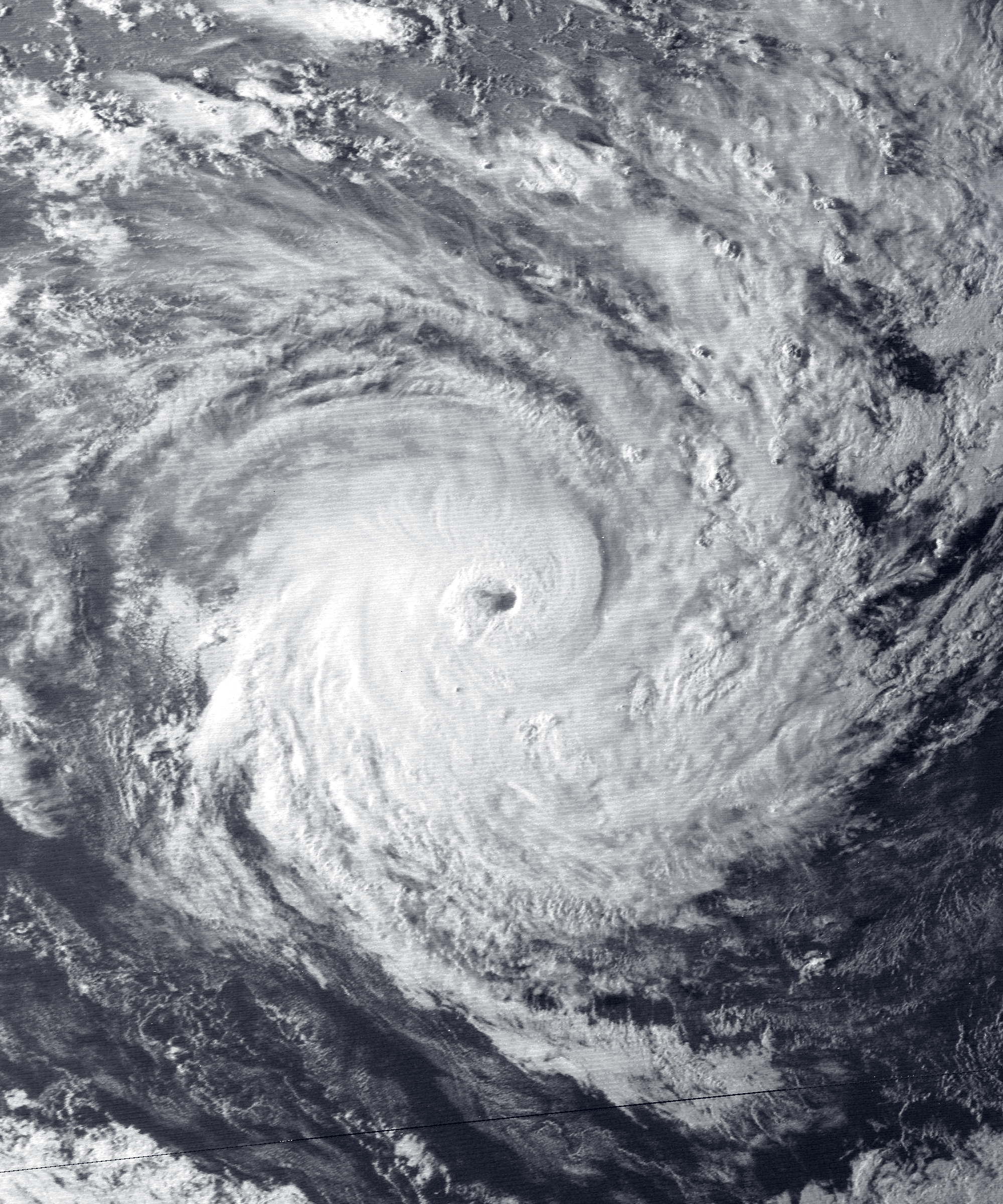
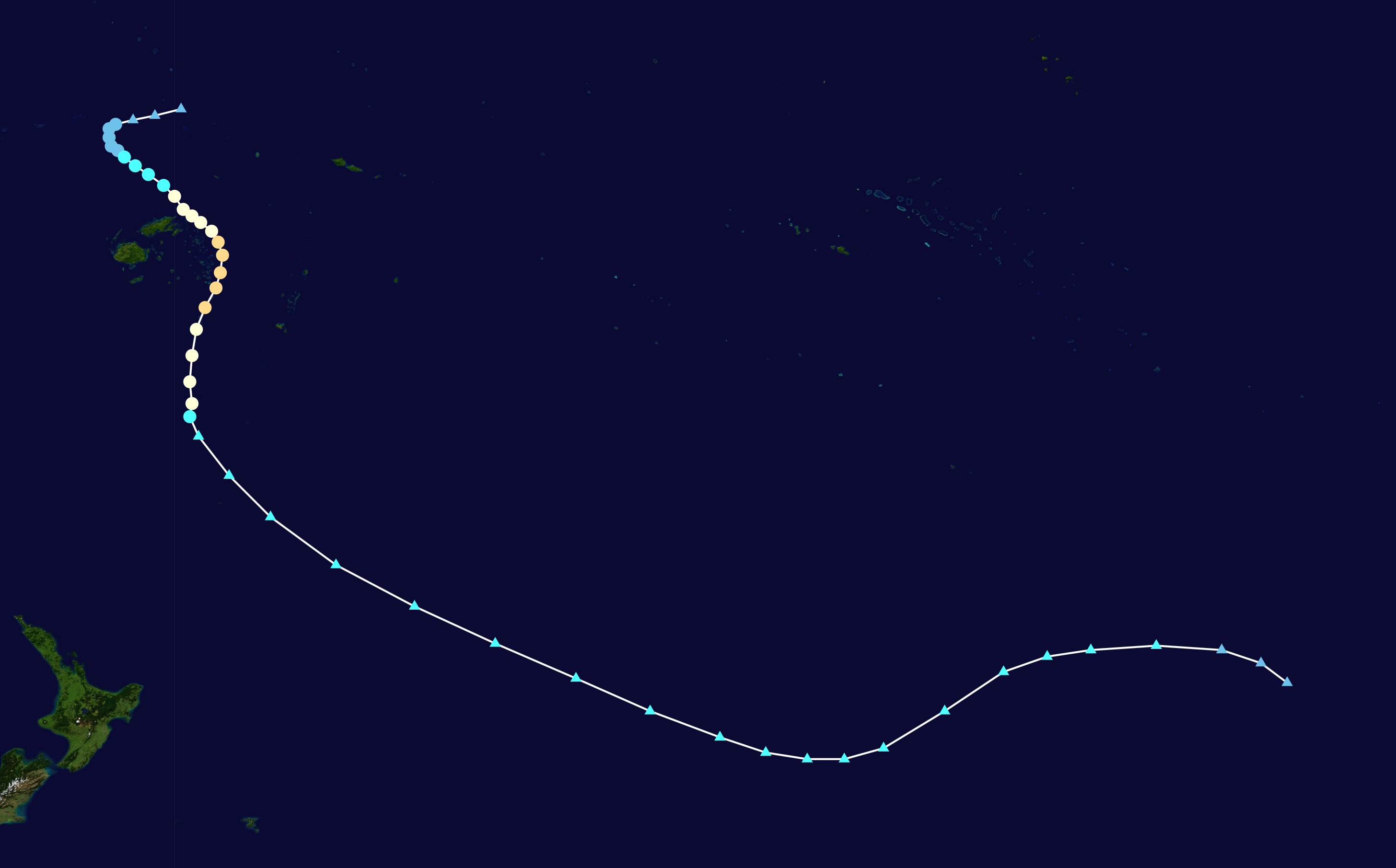
- Duration: March 23 – April 4
- Peak intensity: 165 km/h (105 mph) (10-min); 940 hPa (mbar)

During March 23, a shallow tropical depression developed within a trough of low pressure, about 75 km (45 mi) to the northwest of Rotuma. The system subsequently gradually deepened as it moved south-eastwards and passed to the west of the island, before it was named Sarah by the FMS during March 24, after it had developed into a tropical cyclone. The JTWC subsequently initiated advisories on the system and designated it as Tropical Cyclone 18P.

=== Severe Tropical Cyclone Tomasi ===
- Category 4 severe tropical cyclone (Australian scale)
- Category 3 tropical cyclone (SSHWS)
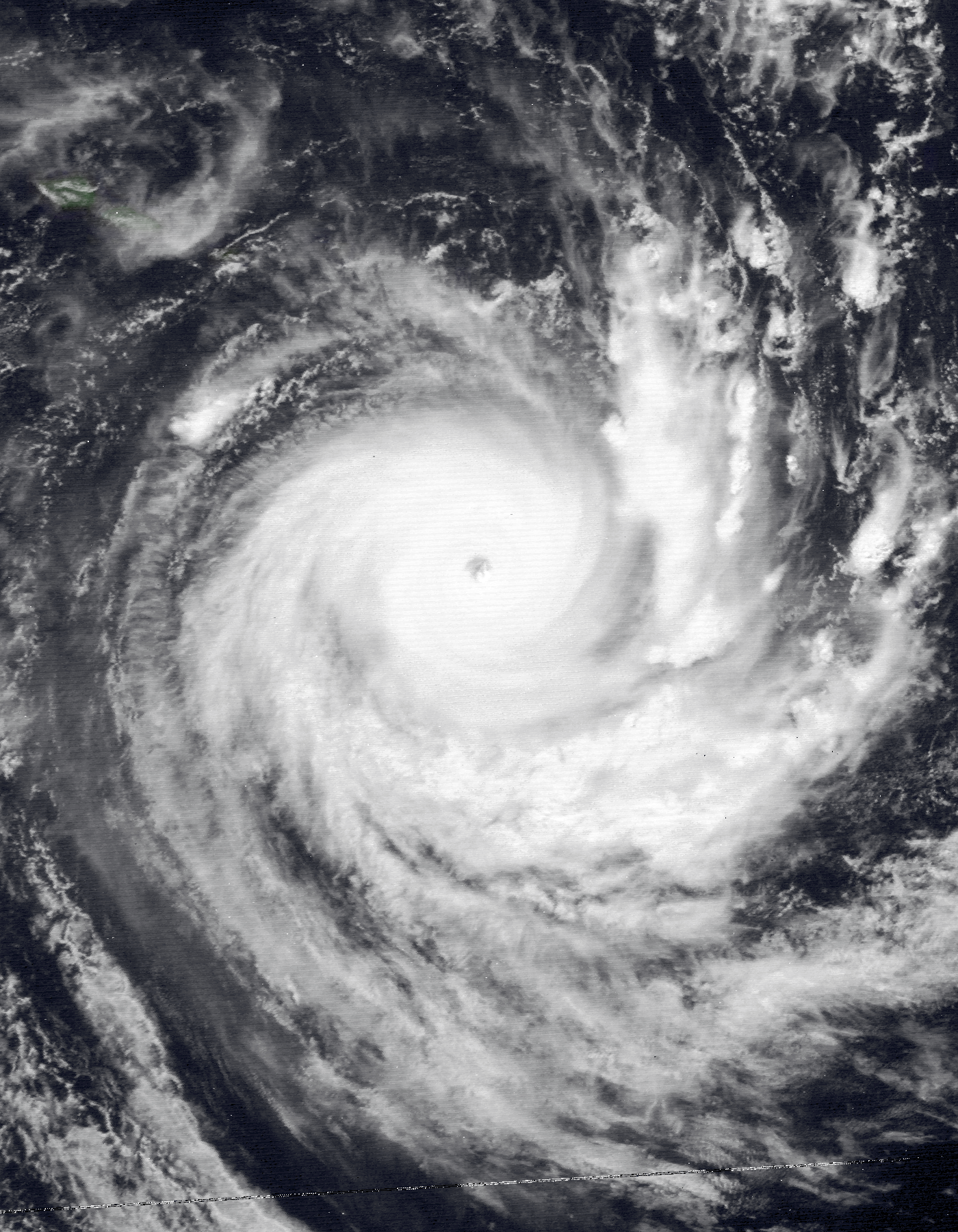
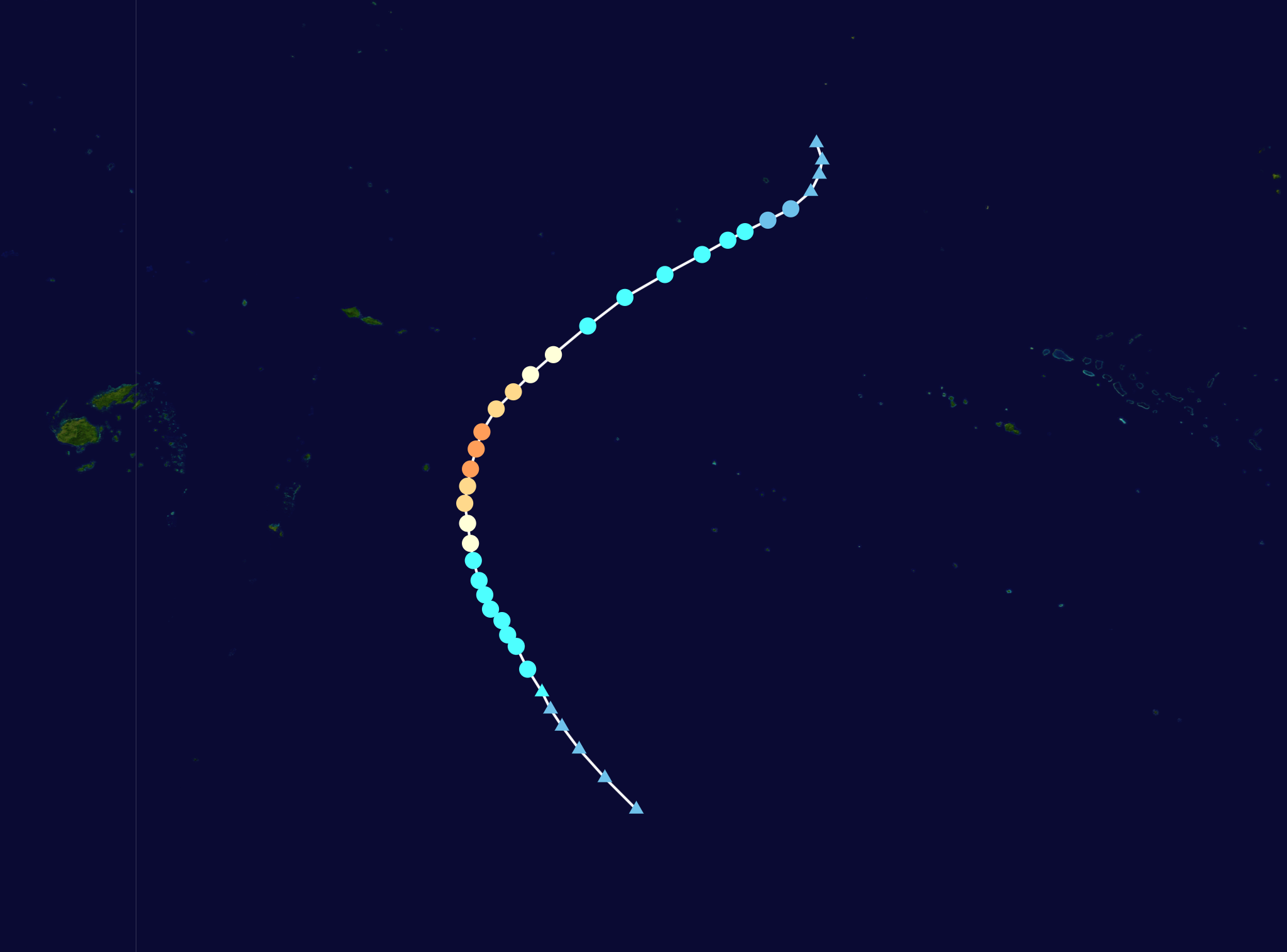
- Duration: March 27 – April 3
- Peak intensity: 185 km/h (115 mph) (10-min); 925 hPa (mbar)

During March 27, the FMS started to monitor a depression that had developed, within a trough of low pressure about 235 km (145 mi) to the northeast of Penrhyn in the Northern Cook Islands. Over the next couple of days, the system moved south-westwards and passed about 140 km (85 mi) to the southeast of Penhryn, as it gradually developed into a tropical cyclone. The depression was subsequently named Tomasi by the FMS during March 29, after it had developed into a Category 1 tropical cyclone on the Australian scale. After the system was named, Tomasi went through a period of rapid intensification, with an eye appearing on visible satellite imagery during that day. It was also classified as a Category 3 severe tropical cyclone, before a tropical cyclone alert was issued by the FMS for Niue at around 23:08 UTC (11:08 FST, March 30).

During the next day, Tomasi continued to intensify and move south-westwards, while the alert for Niue was upgraded to a gale warning. Early on March 31, the NPMOC reported that the cyclone had peaked with 1-minute sustained winds of 185 km/h (115 mph), which made it equivalent to a Category 3 hurricane on the SSHWS. Tomasi subsequently turned and started to move southwards, as it passed about 165 km (105 mi) to the east of Niue. Later that day, the FMS reported that Tomasi had peaked as a Category 4 severe tropical cyclone, with 10-minute sustained winds of 185 km/h (115 mph). During April 2, the system started to rapidly weaken, with its high clouds being sheared away, before it degenerated into a mid latitude depression. Tomasi remnants moved towards the south-southeast, before it was last noted during April 5. Some minor damage to vegetation was reported in Niue, as a result of Tomasi.

=== Severe Tropical Cyclone Veena ===
- Category 4 severe tropical cyclone (Australian scale)
- Category 3 tropical cyclone (SSHWS)
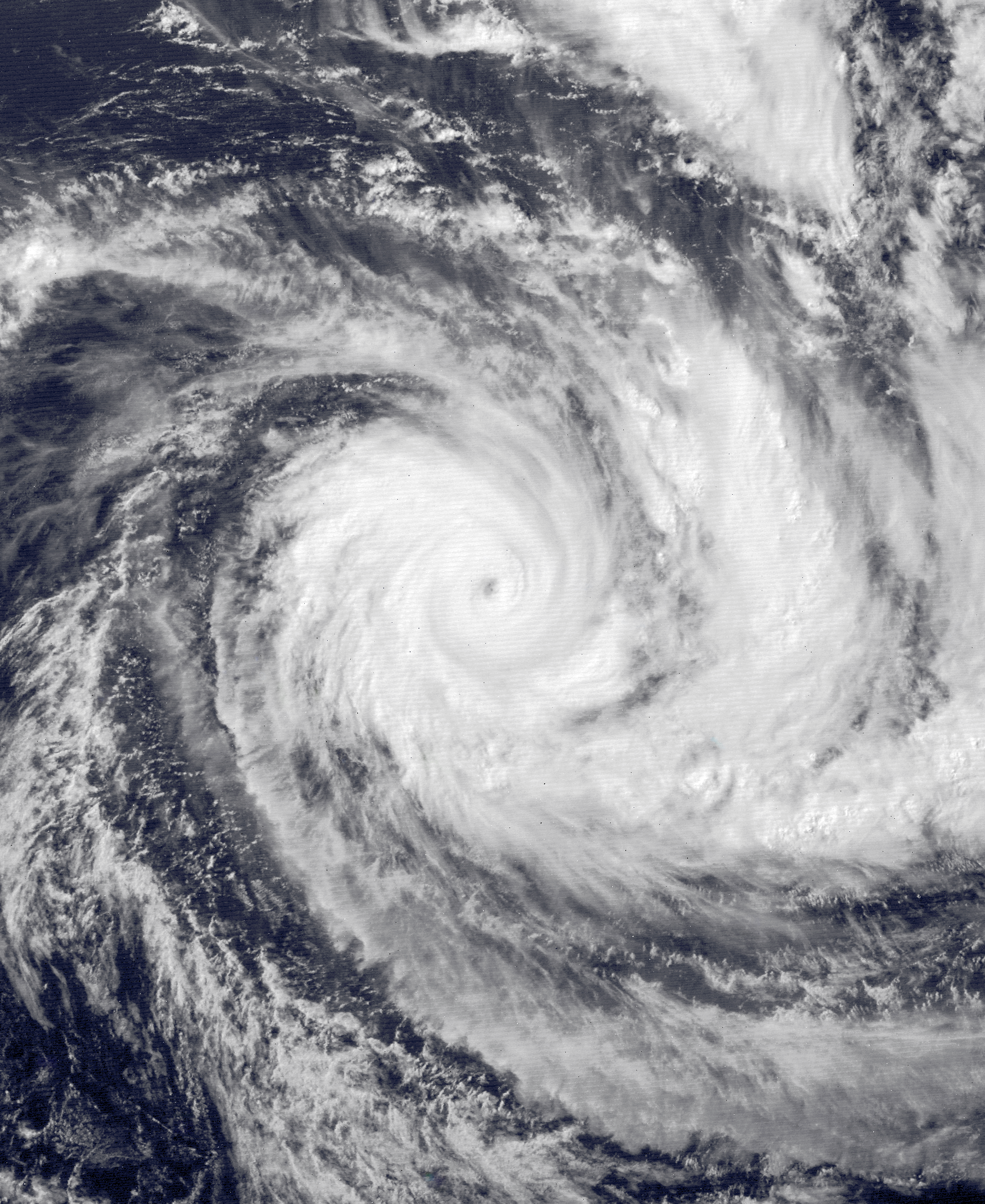
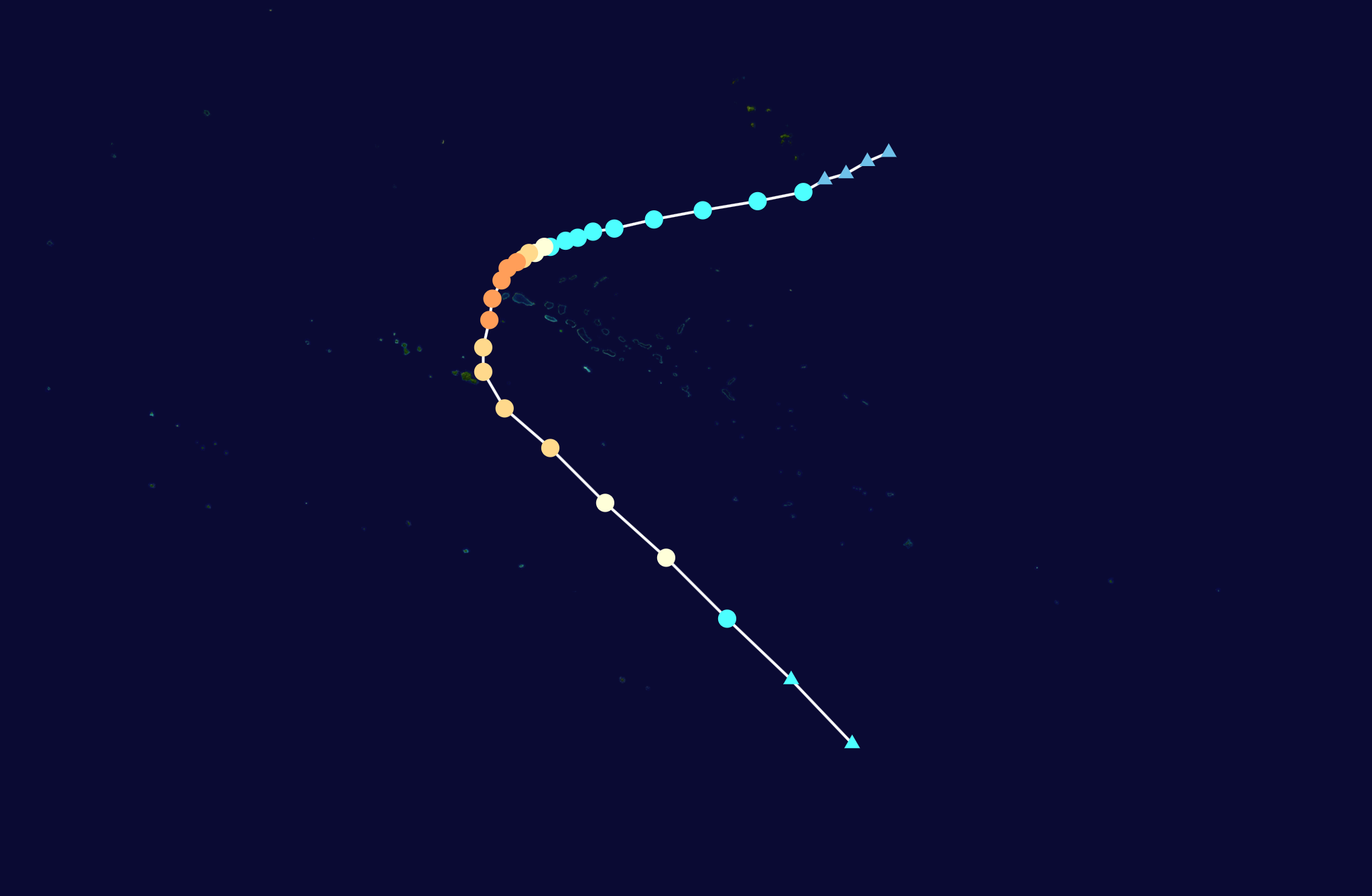
- Duration: April 8 – April 14
- Peak intensity: 185 km/h (115 mph) (10-min); 925 hPa (mbar)

Veena existed from April 8 to April 14.

=== Severe Tropical Cyclone William ===
- Category 3 severe tropical cyclone (Australian scale)
- Category 1 tropical cyclone (SSHWS)
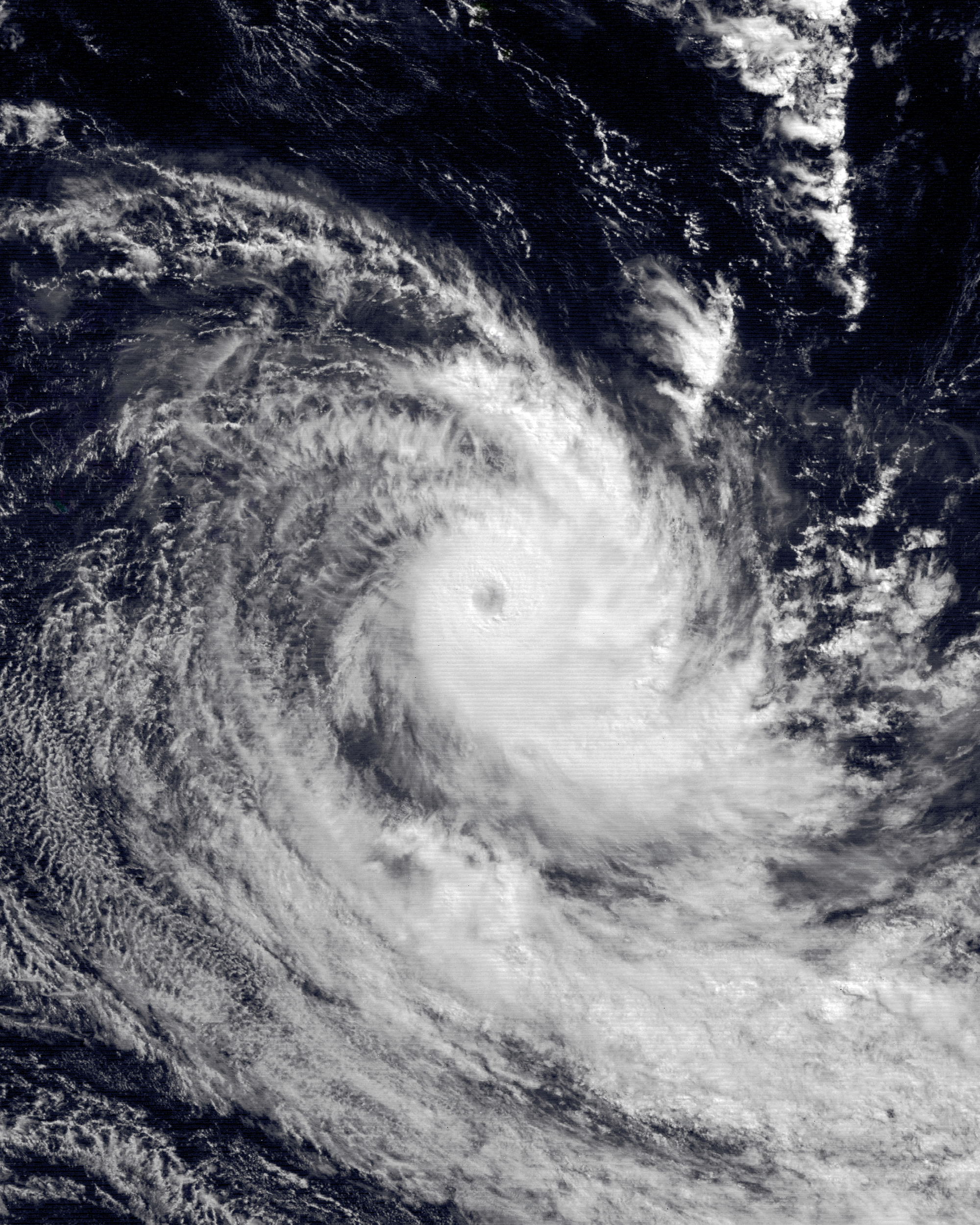
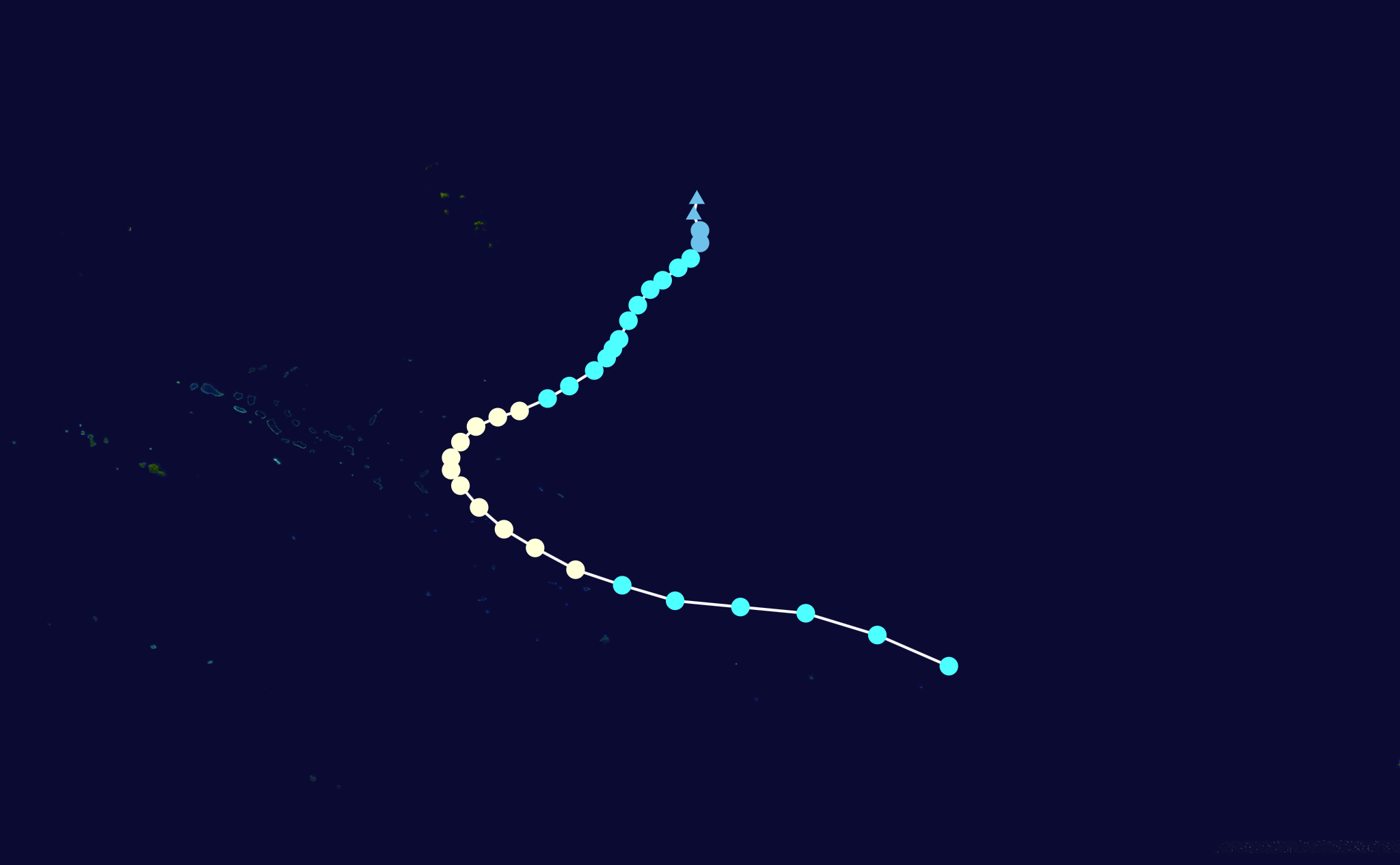
- Duration: April 15 – April 23
- Peak intensity: 150 km/h (90 mph) (10-min); 955 hPa (mbar)

William existed from April 15 to April 23. William was one of the most northeasterly forming cyclones in the basin's history.

=== Other systems ===
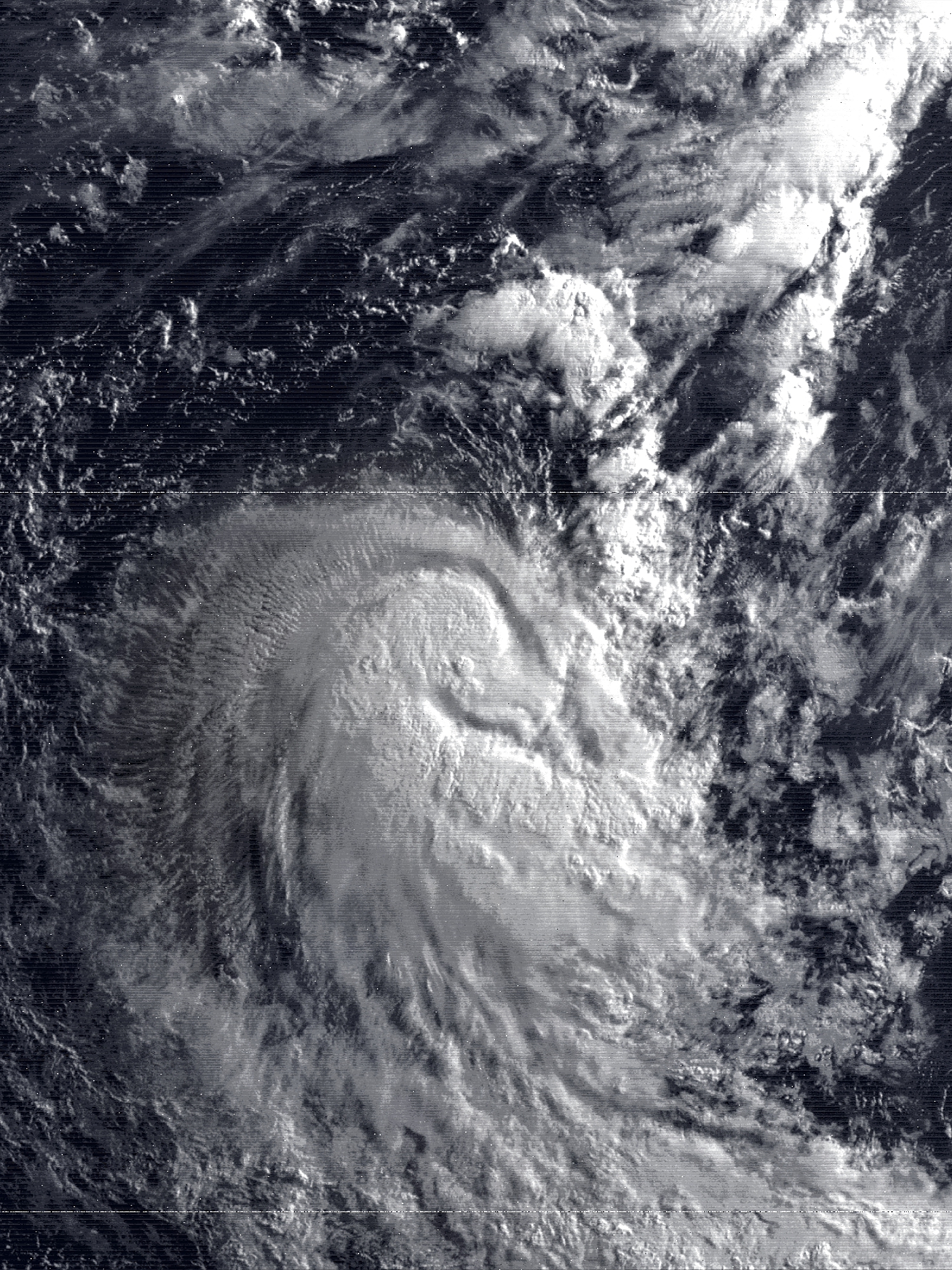
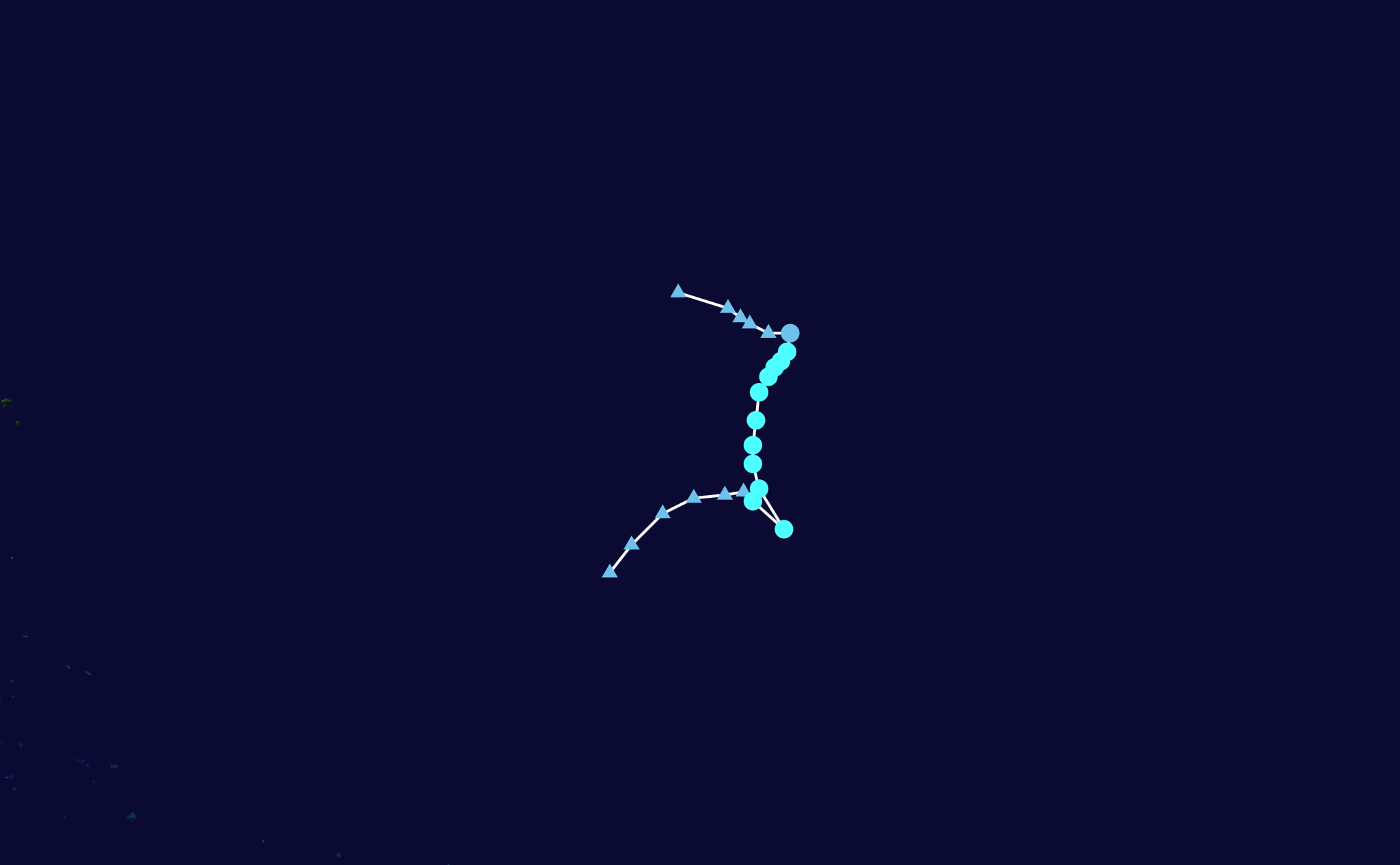
Satellite imagery (left) and track map (right) of the unnamed tropical storm.

After the season had ended, meteorologists at the University of Hawaiʻi identified two tropical depressions, that existed to the east of 130°W on May 11 and May 16, 1983.

Further research into the tropical depression of May 11, by Luis Muñoz Leyton from the Universidad de Valparaíso and José Vicencio from the Chilean Weather Service suggests that the system became an unnamed tropical storm. According to estimates made using the Dvorak technique, the highest sustained wind intensity was close to 65 knots (120 km/h), recorded during the night of May 13, with an estimated minimum pressure between 981 hPa and a Dvorak classification of T4.0, being classified as a category 2 severe tropical cyclone on the Australian and South Pacific cyclone scale. During the early hours of May 14, it began to weaken until it disintegrated on the same day around 12.9°S 115.8°W.

The closest places to this cyclone were Isla de Pascua in Chile, and the island of Fatu-Hiva in French Polynesia.

== Seasonal effects ==
| Name | Dates | Peak intensity | | | Areas affected | Damage (USD) | Deaths | Ref(s). |
| Name | Dates | Category | Wind speed | Pressure | Areas affected | Damage (USD) | Deaths | Ref(s). |
|---|---|---|---|---|---|---|---|---|
| Joti | October 30 – November 7 | Category 2 tropical cyclone | 110 km/h (70 mph) | 975 hPa (28.79 inHg) | Vanuatu | Minor | None | |
| Kina | November 6 – 13 | Category 1 tropical cyclone | 75 km/h (45 mph) | 990 hPa (29.23 inHg) | None | None | None | |
| Lisa | December 10 – 18 | Category 2 tropical cyclone | 110 km/h (70 mph) | 975 hPa (28.79 inHg) | Cook Islands, French Polynesia | | 2 | |
| Mark | January 20 – February 1 | Category 3 severe tropical cyclone | 150 km/h (90 mph) | 955 hPa (28.20 inHg) | Fiji, Tonga | | | |
| Nano | January 21–29 | Category 3 severe tropical cyclone | 120 km/h (75 mph) | 970 hPa (28.64 inHg) | French Polynesia | None | | |
| Nisha–Orama | February 13–28 | Category 4 severe tropical cyclone | 185 km/h (115 mph) | 925 hPa (27.32 inHg) | French Polynesia | $1.7 million | | |
| Oscar | February 23 – March 6 | Category 5 severe tropical cyclone | 205 km/h (125 mph) | 920 hPa (27.17 inHg) | Fiji | $130 million | 9 | |
| Prema | February 25–27 | Category 1 tropical cyclone | 85 km/h (50 mph) | 987 hPa (29.15 inHg) | Cook Islands, French Polynesia | Minor | None | |
| Rewa | March 7–15 | Category 4 severe tropical cyclone | 185 km/h (115 mph) | 925 hPa (27.32 inHg) | French Polynesia | | 5 | |
| Saba | March 20–25 | Category 2 tropical cyclone | 110 km/h (70 mph) | 975 hPa (28.79 inHg) | French Polynesia, Pitcairn Island | | | |
| Sarah | March 23 – April 4 | Category 4 severe tropical cyclone | 165 km/h (105 mph) | 940 hPa (27.76 inHg) | Fiji | | None | |
| Tomasi | March 27 – April 5 | Category 4 severe tropical cyclone | 185 km/h (115 mph) | 925 hPa (27.32 inHg) | Cook Islands, Niue | Minor | None | |
| Veena | April 8–14 | Category 4 severe tropical cyclone | 185 km/h (115 mph) | 925 hPa (27.32 inHg) | French Polynesia | | 1 | |
| William | April 15–23 | Category 3 severe tropical cyclone | 150 km/h (90 mph) | 955 hPa (28.20 inHg) | French Polynesia | | 1 | |
| TD | May 11 | Tropical depression | Not specified | Not specified | None | None | None | |
| TD | May 16 | Tropical depression | Not specified | Not specified | None | None | None | |
Season aggregates
| 15 cyclones | October 31 – May 16 | | 185 km/h (115 mph) | 920 hPa (27.17 inHg) | | >$132 million | 18 | |

== See also ==
- 1997–98 South Pacific cyclone season
- 2014–15 South Pacific cyclone season
- List of off-season South Pacific tropical cyclones
