= 62nd meridian =

62nd meridian may refer to:

- 62nd meridian east, a line of longitude east of the Greenwich Meridian
- 62nd meridian west, a line of longitude west of the Greenwich Meridian

62nd meridian west	62nd meridian east
