= 119th meridian west =

Line of longitude

119th meridian west

The meridian 119° west of Greenwich is a line of longitude that extends from the North Pole across the Arctic Ocean, North America, the Pacific Ocean, the Southern Ocean and Antarctica to the South Pole.

The 119th meridian west forms a great circle with the 61st meridian east.

== From Pole to Pole ==
Starting at the North Pole and heading south to the South Pole, the 119th meridian west passes through:

Co-ordinates	Country, territory or sea	Notes
90°0′N 119°0′W	Arctic Ocean	
77°19′N 119°0′W	Canada	Northwest Territories — Prince Patrick Island
76°8′N 119°0′W	Crozier Channel	
75°46′N 119°0′W	Canada	Northwest Territories — Eglinton Island
75°34′N 119°0′W	M'Clure Strait	
74°0′N 119°0′W	Canada	Northwest Territories — Banks Island
72°40′N 119°0′W	Prince of Wales Strait	
71°56′N 119°0′W	Canada	Northwest Territories — Victoria Island
71°37′N 119°0′W	Amundsen Gulf	
69°16′N 119°0′W	Canada	Nunavut; Northwest Territories — from 67°29′N 119°0′W, passing through the Great Bear Lake; Alberta — from 60°0′N 119°0′W, passing 2.5 km west of Grande Prairie; British Columbia — for about 2 km, from 53°14′N 119°0′W; Alberta — for about 2 km, from 53°12′N 119°0′W; British Columbia — from 53°11′N 119°0′W
49°0′N 119°0′W	United States	Washington, passing just west of the Grand Coulee Dam and just east of Pasco; Oregon — from 45°59′N 119°0′W; Nevada — from 42°0′N 119°0′W; California — from 38°18′N 119°0′W, passing through Mammoth Lakes, Porterville, Bakersfield, and Camarillo
34°4′N 119°0′W	Pacific Ocean	Passing just east of Santa Barbara Island, California, United States (at 33°28′N 119°2′W)
60°0′S 119°0′W	Southern Ocean	
73°43′S 119°0′W	Antarctica	Unclaimed territory

== See also ==
- 118th meridian west
- 120th meridian west
