= 60th meridian =

60th meridian may refer to:

- 60th meridian east, a line of longitude east of the Greenwich Meridian
- 60th meridian west, a line of longitude west of the Greenwich Meridian

60th meridian west	60th meridian east
