= 61st meridian =

61st meridian may refer to:

- 61st meridian east, a line of longitude east of the Greenwich Meridian
- 61st meridian west, a line of longitude west of the Greenwich Meridian

61st meridian west	61st meridian east
