= 60th meridian east =

Line of longitude

60th meridian east

The meridian 60° east of Greenwich is a line of longitude that extends from the North Pole across the Arctic Ocean, Europe, Asia, the Indian Ocean, the Southern Ocean, and Antarctica to the South Pole.

The 60th meridian east forms a great circle with the 120th meridian west.

== From Pole to Pole ==
Starting at the North Pole and heading southward to the South Pole, the 60th meridian east passes through:

Co-ordinates	Country, territory or sea	Notes
90°0′N 60°0′E	Arctic Ocean	
81°18′N 60°0′E	Russia	Hofmann Island, Wilczek Island and Salm Island, Franz Josef Land
79°53′N 60°0′E	Barents Sea	
76°7′N 60°0′E	Russia	Severny Island, Novaya Zemlya
74°42′N 60°0′E	Kara Sea	
70°5′N 60°0′E	Russia	Vaygach Island
69°41′N 60°0′E	Barents Sea	Pechora Sea
68°41′N 60°0′E	Russia	
50°49′N 60°0′E	Kazakhstan	The border with Uzbekistan is in the Aral Sea
44°55′N 60°0′E	Uzbekistan	
42°13′N 60°0′E	Turkmenistan	For about 6km
42°9′N 60°0′E	Uzbekistan	For about 6km
42°5′N 60°0′E	Turkmenistan	For about 9km
42°0′N 60°0′E	Uzbekistan	For about 5km
41°57′N 60°0′E	Turkmenistan	
37°2′N 60°0′E	Iran	
25°23′N 60°0′E	Indian Ocean	Passing just east of the coast of Oman
60°0′S 60°0′E	Southern Ocean	
67°24′S 60°0′E	Antarctica	Australian Antarctic Territory, claimed by Australia

== See also ==
- 59th meridian east
- 61st meridian east
