= 120th meridian west =

Line of longitude

120th meridian west (interactive map)

The 120th meridian defines part of the border between British Columbia and Alberta in Canada, and defines part of the border between California and Nevada in the United States.

The meridian 120° west of Greenwich is a line of longitude that extends from the North Pole across the Arctic Ocean, North America, the Pacific Ocean, the Southern Ocean, and Antarctica to the South Pole.

The 120th meridian west forms a great circle with the 60th meridian east.

In Canada the border between British Columbia and Alberta is defined by the meridian north of where it intersects the Continental Divide of the Americas, and in the United States part of the border between California and Nevada follows it.

This longitude is the eastern limit of the Oakland Oceanic and Tahiti flight information regions, as well as the western limit of the Mazatlan Oceanic FIR.

The mean solar time at this meridian determines the time for the Pacific Time Zone (UTC−08:00) during standard time. Most of the year however, it is the meridian for Alaska Daylight Time, as daylight saving time is observed for two-thirds of the year.

== From Pole to Pole ==
Starting at the North Pole and heading south to the South Pole, the 120th meridian west passes through:

Co-ordinates	Country, territory or sea	Notes
90°0′N 120°0′W	Arctic Ocean	
77°1′N 120°0′W	Canada	Northwest Territories — Prince Patrick Island
75°50′N 120°0′W	M'Clure Strait	
74°17′N 120°0′W	Canada	Northwest Territories — Banks Island
72°14′N 120°0′W	Prince of Wales Strait	
71°32′N 120°0′W	Amundsen Gulf	
69°21′N 120°0′W	Canada	Nunavut; Northwest Territories — passing through Great Bear Lake; British Columbia / Alberta border — from 60°0′N 120°0′W; British Columbia — from Intersection Mountain at 53°48′N 120°0′W; at this point the meridian meets the Continental Divide, and the boundary with Alberta diverts southeast
49°0′N 120°0′W	United States	Washington; Oregon — from 45°49′N 120°0′W; California / Nevada border — from 42°0′N 120°0′W; California — from 39°0′N 120°0′W, through South Lake Tahoe and just east of Madera
34°27′N 120°0′W	Pacific Ocean	Santa Barbara Channel
33°59′N 120°0′W	United States	California — Santa Rosa Island
33°57′N 120°0′W	Pacific Ocean	
60°0′S 120°0′W	Southern Ocean	
73°44′S 120°0′W	Antarctica	Unclaimed territory

== Discrepancies at the California–Nevada border ==
When California attained statehood in 1850, it adopted 120th meridian west as its eastern border. Between 1855 and 1900 there were six surveys to locate 120 degrees, with each locating the line of longitude differently. In 1872, Alexey W. Von Schmidt undertook the survey of the state line. He marked his survey line with stones, wood, and iron markers; the only one who placed such markers. A new survey in 1893 showed that the Von Schmidt line was 1,600–1,800 feet (490–550 m) west of the actual 120 degrees. However, California and Nevada both recognize the 1872 Von Schmidt survey and the 1893 survey as the state line. Google Maps shows that the Verdi, Nevada California–Nevada boundary marker, located at 39.52451°N 120.00186°W, is approximately 525 feet (160 m) west of 120 degrees longitude, with a similar deviation along the length of the line from Oregon to Lake Tahoe.

== See also ==
- 119th meridian west
- 121st meridian west
