= 62nd meridian east =

Line of longitude

62nd meridian east

The meridian 62° east of Greenwich is a line of longitude that extends from the North Pole across the Arctic Ocean, Europe, Asia, the Indian Ocean, the Southern Ocean, and Antarctica to the South Pole.

The 62nd meridian east forms a great circle with the 118th meridian west.

== From Pole to Pole ==
Starting at the North Pole and heading south to the South Pole, the 60th meridian east passes through:

Co-ordinates	Country, territory or sea	Notes
90°0′N 62°0′E	Arctic Ocean	
81°38′N 62°0′E	Russia	Adelaide Island and Frieden Island, Franz Josef Land, Arkhangelsk Oblast
81°31′N 62°0′E	Arctic Ocean	
80°51′N 62°0′E	Russia	Wilczek Island, Franz Josef Land, Arkhangelsk Oblast
80°34′N 62°0′E	Barents Sea	
76°16′N 62°0′E	Russia	Severny Island, Novaya Zemlya, Arkhangelsk Oblast
75°26′N 62°0′E	Kara Sea	
69°45′N 62°0′E	Russia	Nenetsia, Komi, Khantia-Mansia, Sverdlovsk Ob., Chelyabinsk Ob., Kurgan Ob.
53°57′N 62°0′E	Kazakhstan	Kostanay Region
53°8′N 62°0′E	Russia	Chelyabinsk Oblast
52°57′N 62°0′E	Kazakhstan	Kostanay Reg., Aktobe Reg., Kyzylorda Reg.
43°30′N 62°0′E	Uzbekistan	
40°53′N 62°0′E	Turkmenistan	
35°27′N 62°0′E	Afghanistan	
29°31′N 62°0′E	Pakistan	Balochistan
28°32′N 62°0′E	Iran	
26°17′N 62°0′E	Pakistan	Balochistan
25°6′N 62°0′E	Indian Ocean	
60°0′S 62°0′E	Southern Ocean	
67°32′S 62°0′E	Antarctica	Australian Antarctic Territory, claimed by Australia

== See also ==
- 61st meridian east
- 63rd meridian east
