= 61st meridian east =

Line of longitude

61st meridian east

The meridian 61° east of Greenwich is a line of longitude that extends from the North Pole across the Arctic Ocean, Europe, Asia, the Indian Ocean, the Southern Ocean, and Antarctica to the South Pole.

The 61st meridian east forms a great circle with the 119th meridian west.

== From Pole to Pole ==
Starting at the North Pole and heading south to the South Pole, the 61st meridian east passes through:

Co-ordinates	Country, territory or sea	Notes
90°0′N 61°0′E	Arctic Ocean	
81°6′N 61°0′E	Russia	La Ronciere Island and Wilczek Island, Franz Josef Land
80°22′N 61°0′E	Barents Sea	
76°14′N 61°0′E	Russia	Severny Island, Novaya Zemlya
75°10′N 61°0′E	Kara Sea	
69°50′N 61°0′E	Russia	
53°55′N 61°0′E	Kazakhstan	For about 4km
53°53′N 61°0′E	Russia	
53°40′N 61°0′E	Kazakhstan	For about 6km
53°37′N 61°0′E	Russia	
52°51′N 61°0′E	Kazakhstan	
52°26′N 61°0′E	Russia	For about 14km
52°18′N 61°0′E	Kazakhstan	
51°28′N 61°0′E	Russia	
50°41′N 61°0′E	Kazakhstan	
44°25′N 61°0′E	Uzbekistan	
41°14′N 61°0′E	Turkmenistan	
36°39′N 61°0′E	Iran	
34°42′N 61°0′E	Afghanistan	
31°28′N 61°0′E	Iran	
29°59′N 61°0′E	Afghanistan	For about 19km
29°49′N 61°0′E	Pakistan	Balochistan - for about 12km
29°43′N 61°0′E	Iran	
25°13′N 61°0′E	Indian Ocean	
60°0′S 61°0′E	Southern Ocean	
67°27′S 61°0′E	Antarctica	Australian Antarctic Territory, claimed by Australia

== See also ==
- 60th meridian east
- 62nd meridian east
