= Crozier Channel =

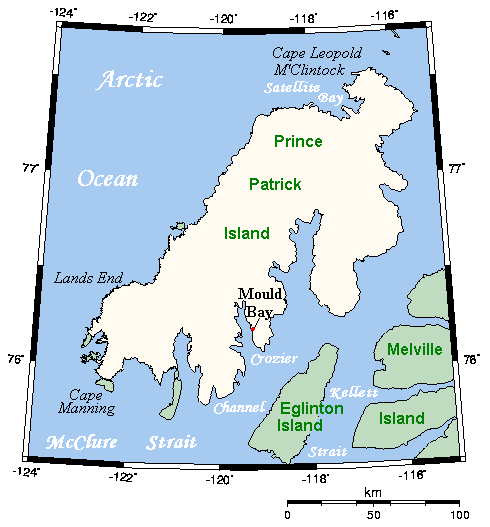
Map of Prince Patrick Island, showing Crozier Channel

The Crozier Channel (76°0′N 119°0′W) is a natural waterway through the central Canadian Arctic Archipelago in the Northwest Territories of Canada. It separates Prince Patrick Island (to the north-west) and Eglinton Island (to the south-east). It opens into the McClure Strait at its southern end. It is named for the explorer, Francis Crozier; one of several such memorials in the Canadian Arctic.
