= 1984 Pacific typhoon season =

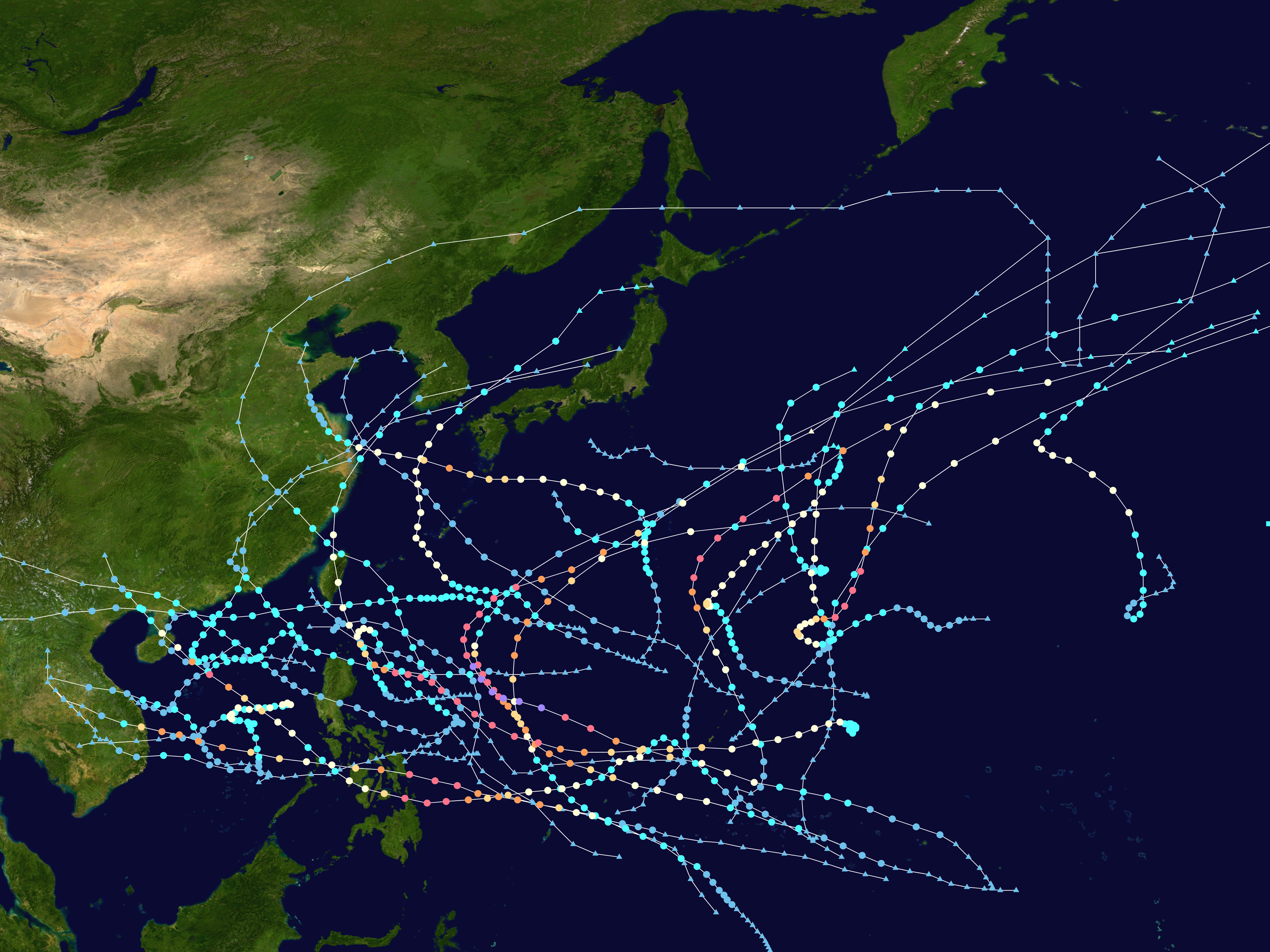
- Season summary map

Seasonal boundaries
- First system formed: June 7, 1984
- Last system dissipated: December 12, 1984

Strongest storm
- Name: Vanessa
  - Maximum winds: 220 km/h (140 mph) (10-minute sustained)
  - Lowest pressure: 880 hPa (mbar)

Seasonal statistics
- Total depressions: 44
- Total storms: 27
- Typhoons: 16
- Very strong typhoons: 8
- Violent typhoons: 2
- Total fatalities: 2,820 total
- Total damage: > $348 million (1984 USD)

Related articles
- 1984 Atlantic hurricane season; 1984 Pacific hurricane season; 1984 North Indian Ocean cyclone season

The 1984 Pacific typhoon season had the second-latest start in the basin on record, only behind the previous year, 1983, by one day. Despite this, it was above average in terms of named storms and featured many intense storms. It ran year-round in 1984, but again all tropical cyclones formed between June and November. These dates conventionally delimit the period of each year when most tropical cyclones form in the northwestern Pacific Ocean. A total of 44 tropical depressions formed this year, of which only 27 became tropical storms and were assigned a name by the Joint Typhoon Warning Center. This made the season above average when compared to the long term mean of 25 storms per season. Additionally, tropical depressions that enter or form in the Philippine area of responsibility are assigned a name by the Philippine Atmospheric, Geophysical and Astronomical Services Administration or PAGASA. This can often result in the same storm having two names. This year, a total of 20 storms were named this way.

Of the 27 tropical storms, 16 reached typhoon intensity, and two reached super typhoon strength. Eight tropical cyclones moved into mainland China, four struck Vietnam, four moved through the Philippines, and one cyclone moved into South Korea. The second consecutive typhoon season with a late start, all of the season activity was contained between June and December, with August and October the most active months, contributing to half of the seasonal tropical cyclone count.

== Season summary ==
Despite its late start, a total of 30 tropical depressions formed this year in the Western Pacific, of which 27 became tropical storms. A total of 16 storms reached typhoon intensity, of which 2 reached super typhoon strength. Three of the systems formed in June, four in July, seven in August, four in September, eight in October, three in November, and one in December. Eight tropical cyclones moved into mainland China, four struck Vietnam, four moved through the Philippines, and one cyclone moved into South Korea. The most damaging and deadly typhoon this season was Ike, which led to significant damage and two-thirds of the overall seasonal death toll, mainly from the Philippines. The longest lived cyclone was Bill, which persisted for two weeks during mid November. Despite the eight tropical cyclones moving into China, Hong Kong received only 18 percent of its annual rainfall from tropical cyclones, which was 35 percent below the annual average.

== Systems ==
=== Tropical Storm Vernon ===
- Tropical storm (JMA)
- Tropical storm (SSHWS)
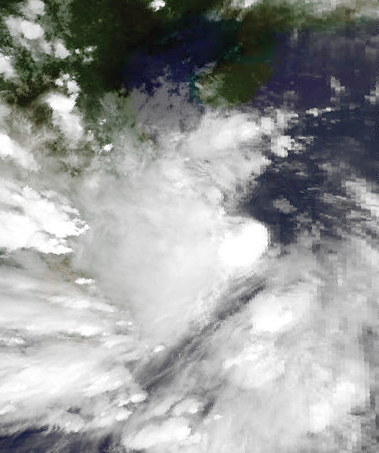
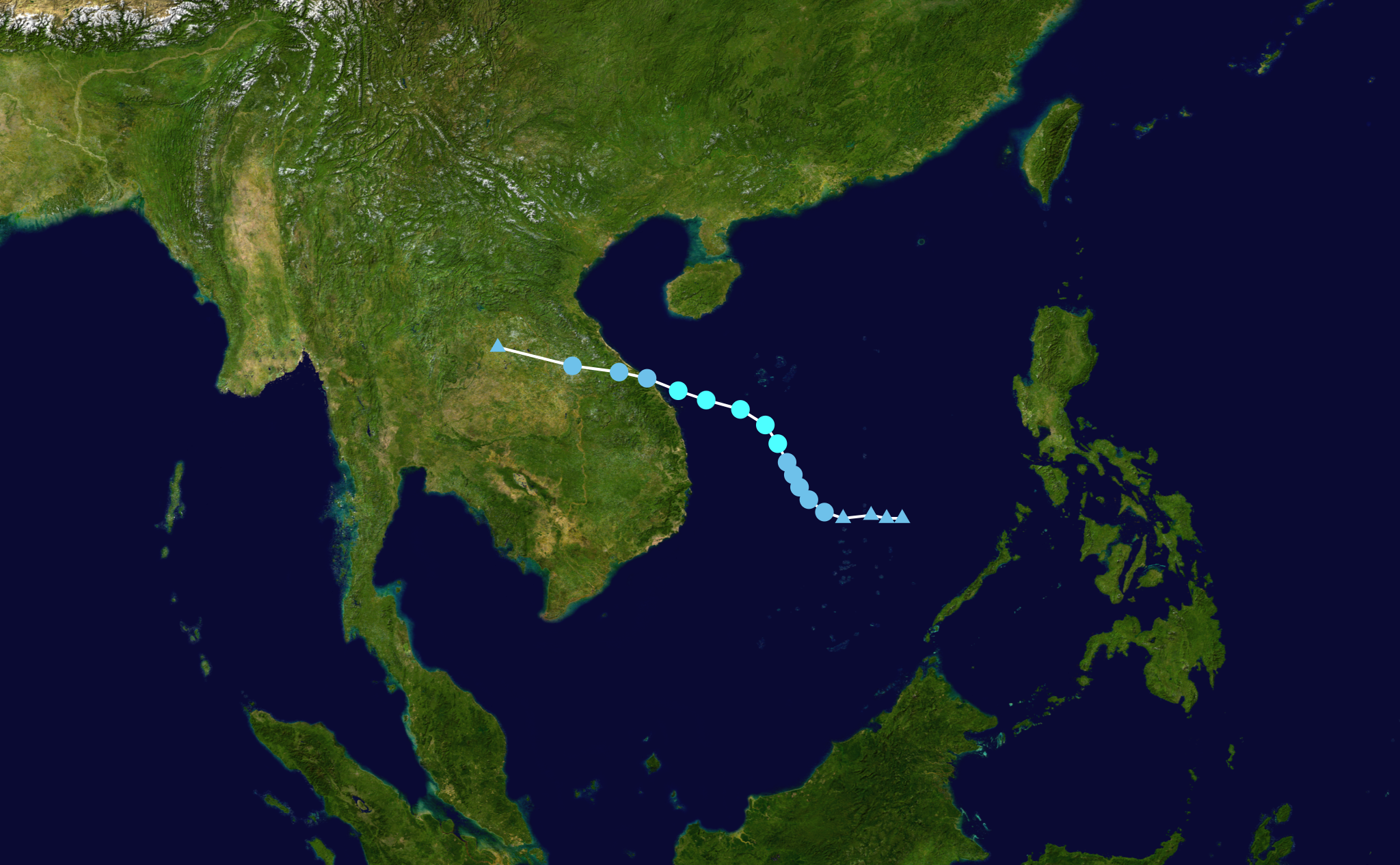
- Duration: June 7 – June 11
- Peak intensity: 75 km/h (45 mph) (10-min); 994 hPa (mbar)

Tropical Storm Vernon, the first of the year, developed in the South China Sea on June 6. It moved northwest, and then westward in an environment of strong vertical wind shear, Vernon moved inland into Vietnam on June 10. Flooding of rice, sweet potato, and sesame crops in Quảng Nam-Da Nang province was caused by Vernon. Combined with 1983's late formation of Tropical Storm Sarah in June, this is only known time that two consecutive years had their first storm develop as late as June.

=== Severe Tropical Storm Wynne (Asiang) ===
- Severe tropical storm (JMA)
- Tropical storm (SSHWS)
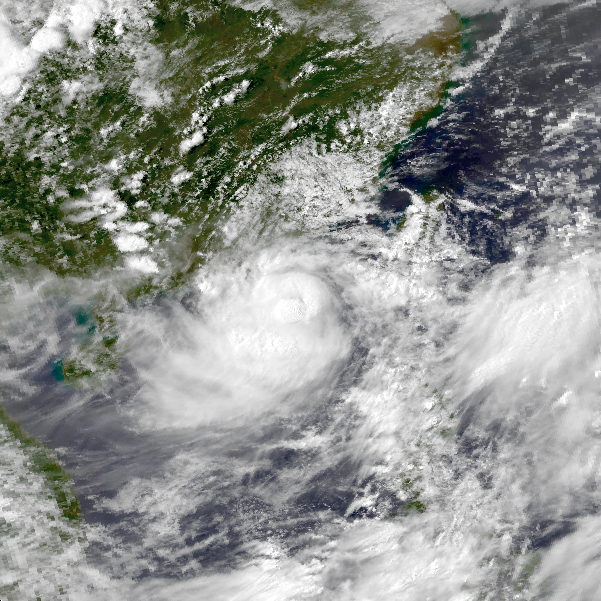
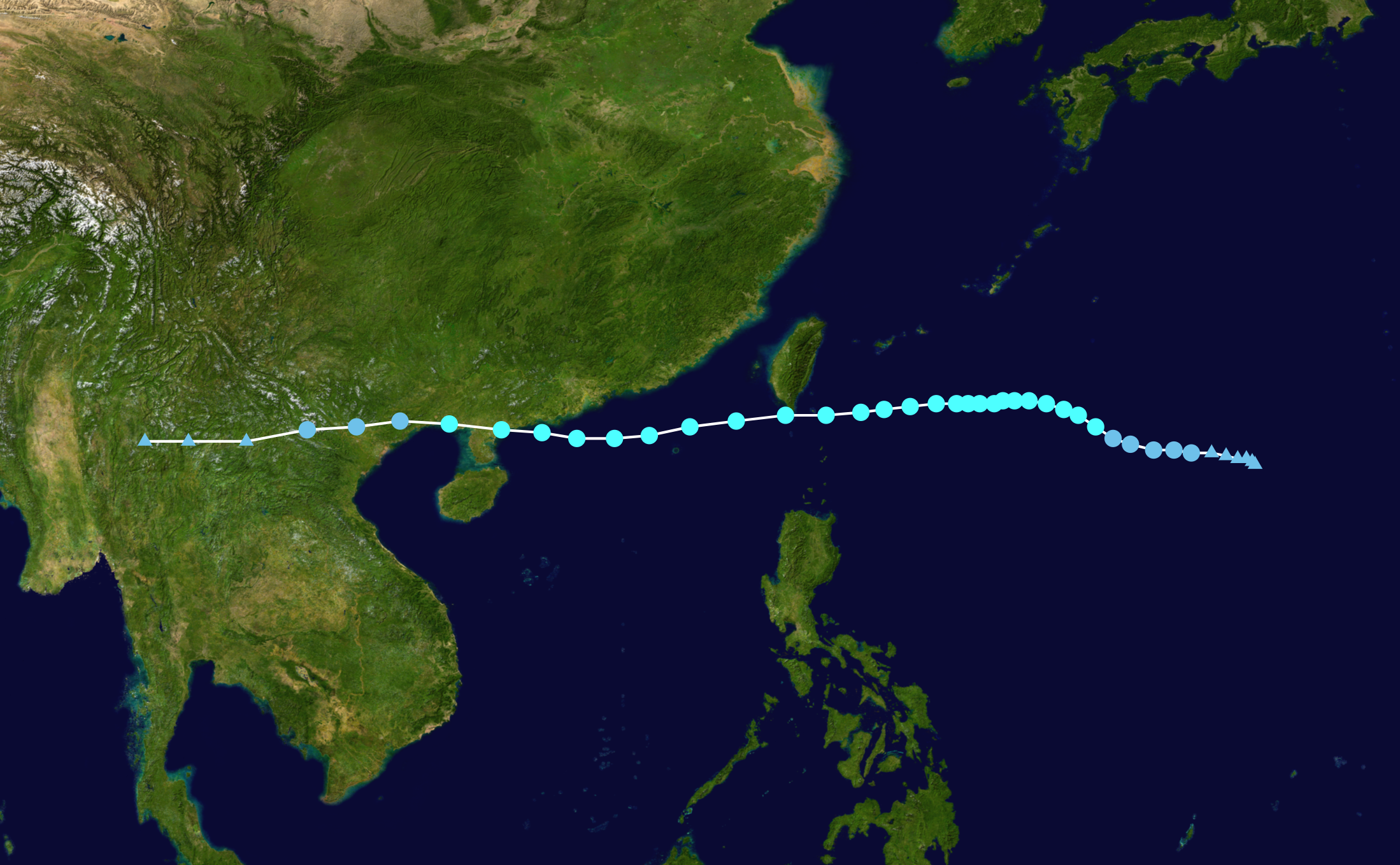
- Duration: June 18 – June 27
- Peak intensity: 100 km/h (65 mph) (10-min); 980 hPa (mbar)

The monsoon trough established itself across the South China Sea eastward into the Philippine Sea on June 14. A tropical disturbance formed within this trough on June 16 in the northern Philippine Sea. Moving westward for much of its existence to the south of a narrow subtropical ridge, an upper level high developed over the strengthening low level circulation early on June 19, which became a tropical depression that day. By that evening, the cyclone had strengthened into a tropical storm. Strong upper level ridging over mainland China led to easterly vertical wind shear, which limited intensification. The cyclone passed by the southern coast of Taiwan, which caused slight weakening as it entered the South China Sea. Passing south of Hong Kong, a U. S. Naval ship and Hong Kong both reported winds of 60 knots (110 km/h), with gusts to 82 knots (152 km/h) reported at Tate's Cairn and 70 knots (130 km/h) noted out at sea. Southwest flow to the south of Wynne led to flooding in Luzon, where 100 square kilometres (25,000 acres) of riceland was destroyed. Three fisherman drowned north of Luzon. Late on June 25, Wynne made landfall in China near the Luichow Peninsula, and then entered Gulf of Tonkin, made final landfall in Quảng Ninh Province and weakened rapidly inland.

The lowest sea-level atmospheric pressure observed in Tiên Yên during the storm was 987.8 hPa, recorded at 04:00 (UTC+7) on June 26.

=== Typhoon Alex (Biring) ===
- Typhoon (JMA)
- Category 1 typhoon (SSHWS)
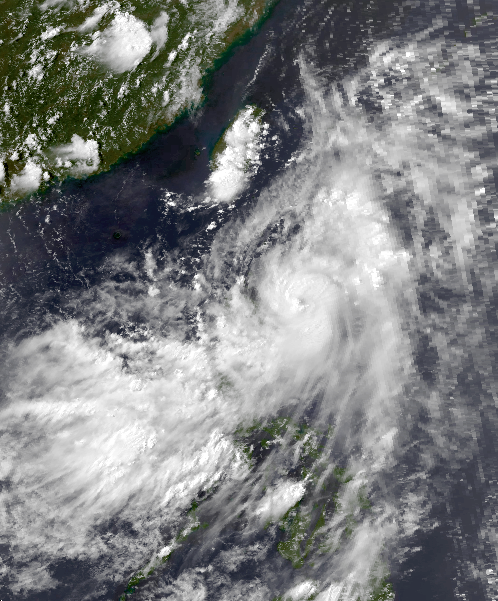
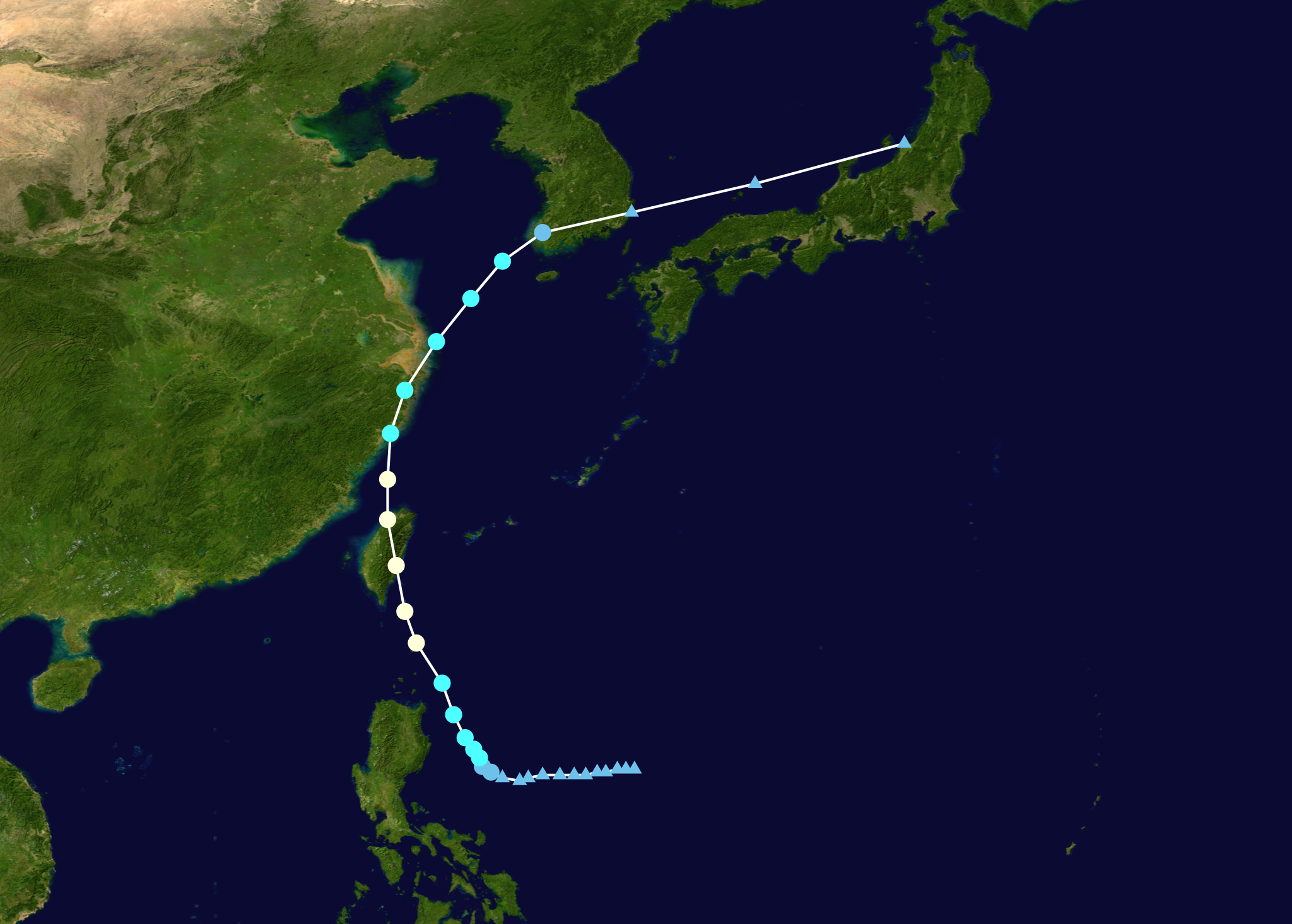
- Duration: July 1 – July 4
- Peak intensity: 150 km/h (90 mph) (10-min); 960 hPa (mbar)

On June 28, a surface circulation formed in the Philippine Sea. Development of the system began in earnest on June 30, and a tropical depression had formed early on July 1, with tropical storm status attained later in the day. A ridge to its north eroded, allowing Alex to move north-northwest towards Taiwan. Alex became the first typhoon of the season shortly before moving across the mountainous island. On July 5, extratropical transition of Alex had begun. By late in the day, it was an extratropical cyclone along a frontal zone in the Sea of Japan.

=== Severe Tropical Storm Betty (Konsing) ===
- Severe tropical storm (JMA)
- Tropical storm (SSHWS)
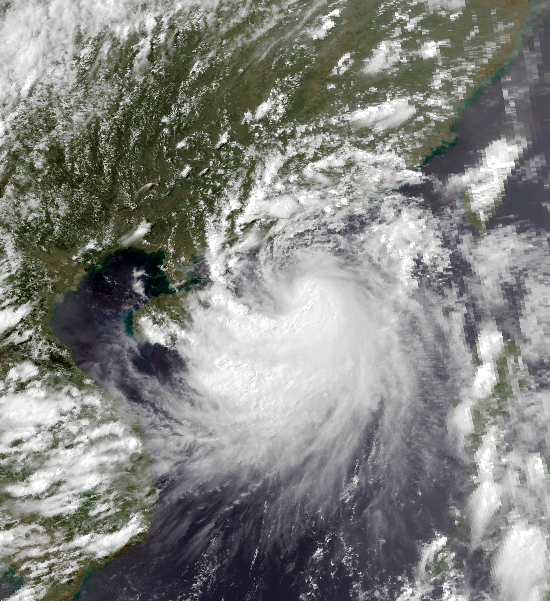
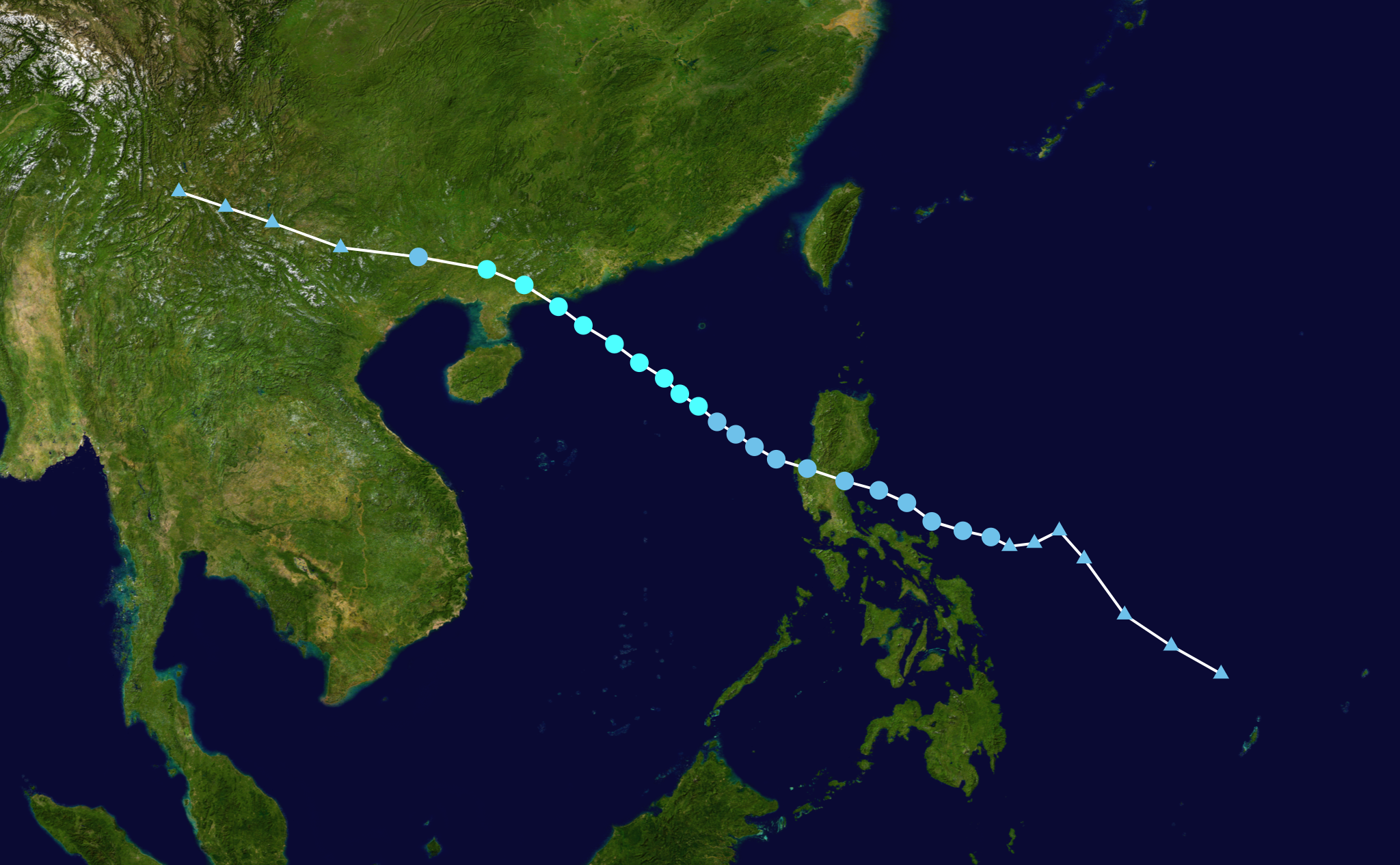
- Duration: July 4 – July 10
- Peak intensity: 95 km/h (60 mph) (10-min); 985 hPa (mbar)

Development of this system was slow within the eastern portion of the monsoon trough. By midday on July 2, the disturbance was first noted about 1,020 kilometres (630 mi) southwest of Guam. The system moved northwest for much of its life cycle, initially following Alex and then the southwest side of the subtropical ridge. A broad tropical depression formed on the afternoon on July 5 within the disturbed weather area, weakening as it passed over Luzon. Late on July 7, ship reports indicated the system had become a tropical storm. The cyclone moved within the radar fence of Hong Kong near its peak intensity before making landfall 250 kilometres (160 mi) to its west-southwest during the early afternoon of July 9. Winds gusted to 70 knots (130 km/h) at Green Island. Weakening over the topography of China was rapid thereafter, and the system dissipated by early on July 10.

=== Typhoon Cary ===
- Typhoon (JMA)
- Category 2 typhoon (SSHWS)
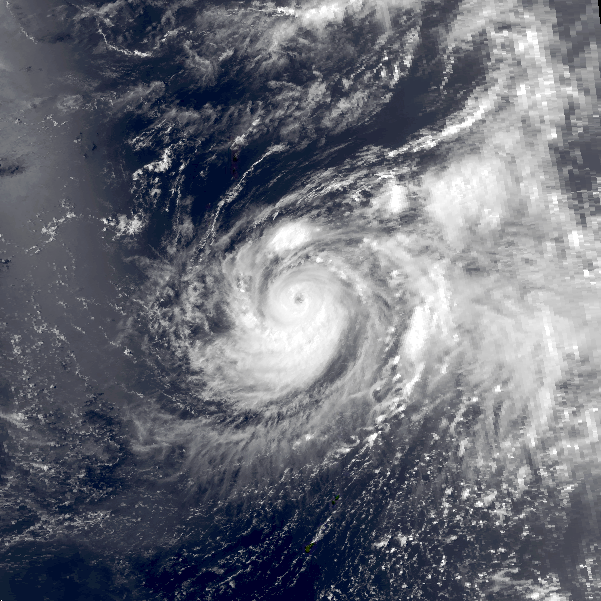
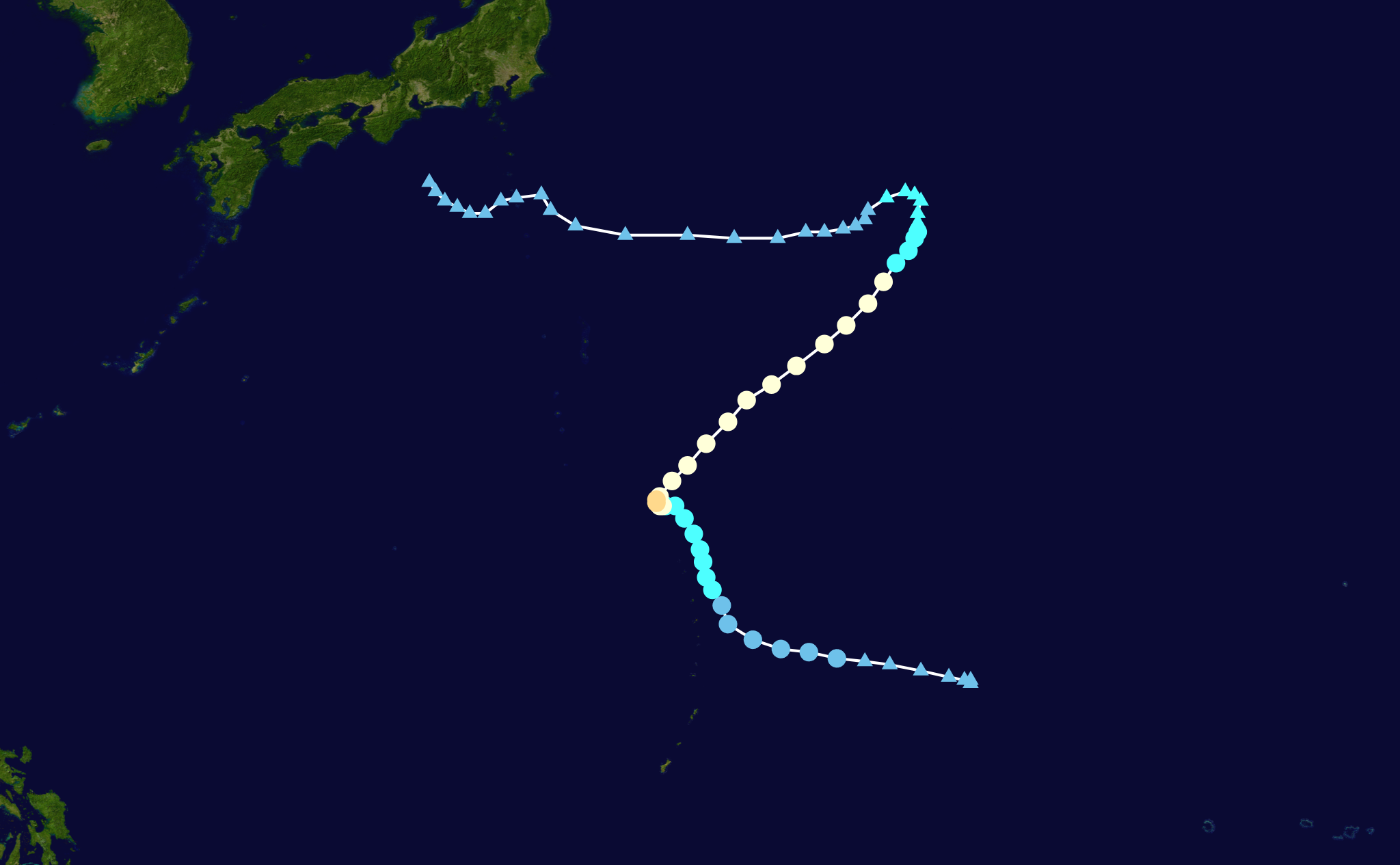
- Duration: July 6 – July 17
- Peak intensity: 150 km/h (90 mph) (10-min); 955 hPa (mbar)

Initiated by the tropical tropospheric trough (TUTT), an area of convection was first noted southeast of the upper trough in an area with favorable upper level divergence on July 2 near 18N 168E. The disturbance moved west-southwest and evolved into a tropical depression late on July 6 and a tropical storm soon after. The cyclone moved northwest towards a break in the subtropical ridge and reached typhoon status late on July 9 forming a large eye about 55 kilometres (34 mi) in diameter. Rapid development continued for another 12 hours as it slowly moved through the ridge axis. The cyclone turned northeast late on July 10 as it began to be sheared significantly from the northwest. Shearing relented on July 11 allowing the eye to reform, this time 75 kilometres (47 mi) wide. As the typhoon progressed more poleward, increased vertical wind shear and the entrainment of cooler and drier air began its extratropical transition. By late on July 14, Cary had become an extratropical cyclone. The nontropical system then moved westward, eventually dissipating south of Japan.

=== Typhoon Dinah ===
- Very strong typhoon (JMA)
- Category 4 typhoon (SSHWS)
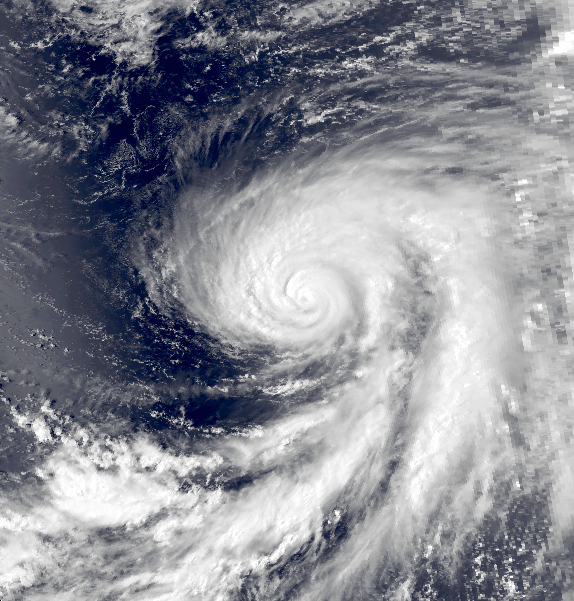
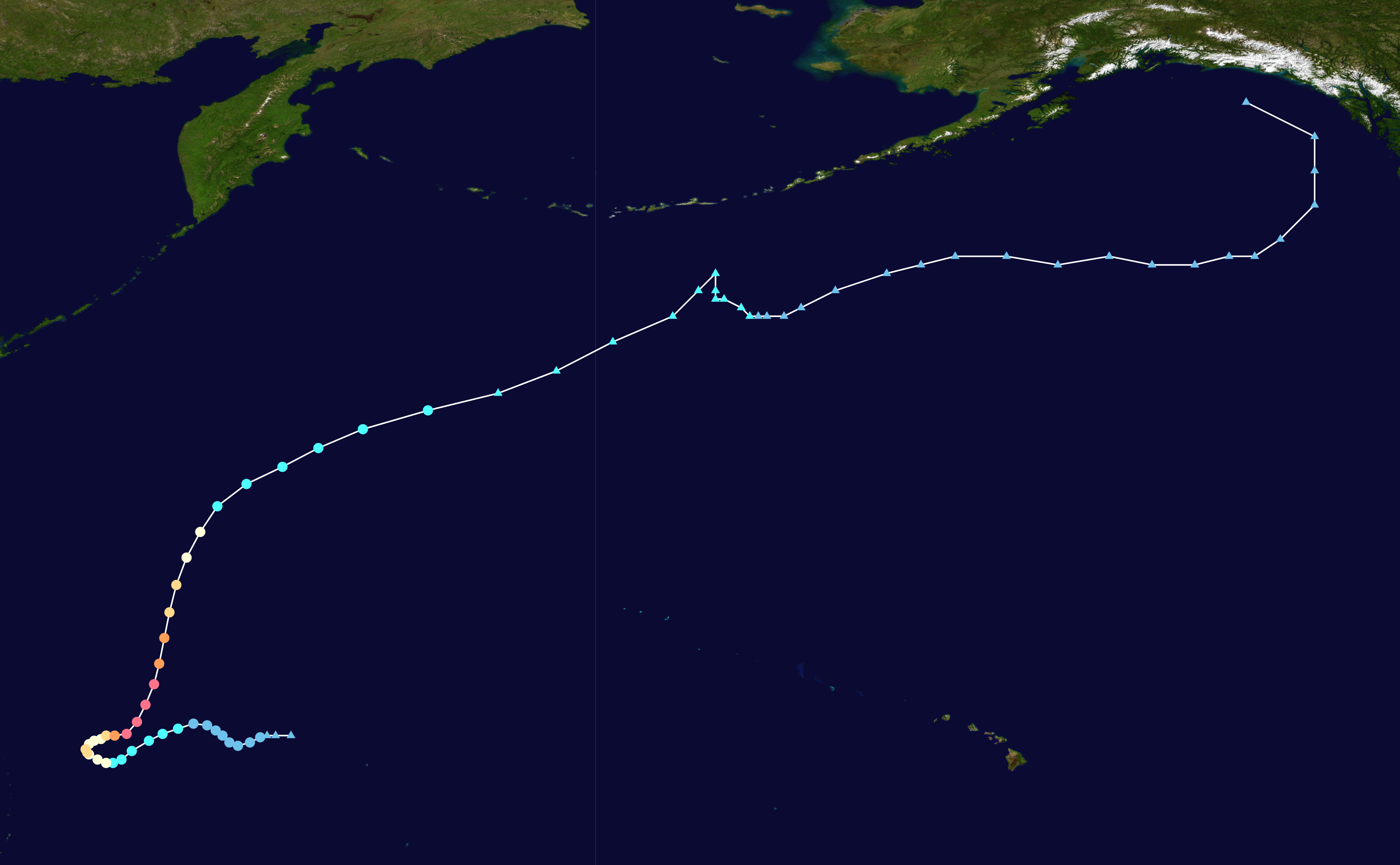
- Duration: July 24 – August 1
- Peak intensity: 185 km/h (115 mph) (10-min); 915 hPa (mbar)

For two weeks after Betty and Cary, a high pressure dominated the northwest Pacific, with no sign of a monsoon trough. A cold front dropped into the area from the north, and remained stationary across much of the central North Pacific just north of Wake Island for nearly a week. An area of convection along the tail of the old frontal boundary formed on July 21, and closed off a wind circulation just northwest of Wake Island. Drifting westward, the system did not develop considerably until July 23. By late on July 24, it became a tropical depression. Intensifying while moving west-southwest, the system became a typhoon late on July 25 with a 55 kilometres (34 mi) wide eye.

Meanwhile, Tropical Storm Ed was approaching from the northwest and the ridge north of Dinah moved east, which turned the typhoon northwest. For 48 hours between July 26 and July 28, Dinah and Ed were between 1,165 and 1,670 kilometres (724 and 1,038 mi) from one another, and fujiwhara interaction did impart a slight change onto Dinah's track. On July 27, while the cyclones were at their closest approach, Dinah weakened due to the more dominant outflow from Ed. The westerly shear led to a change in track to the east-northeast for Dinah. On July 28, once the cyclones moved farther apart, Dinah restrengthened rapidly and reached its maximum intensity by noon on July 29. Moving north-northeast around the western fringe of the subtropical ridge, Dinah's motion accelerated, moving close to Marcus Island late that afternoon, causing extensive vegetation damage. The coast guard station on the island sustained US$30,000 in damage (1984 dollars) when sustained winds reached 63 knots (117 km/h), with gusts to 89 knots (165 km/h). Weakening as it continued to move north-northeast, Dinah regained tropical storm status on July 31. Veering more northeast and interacting with a nearby upper trough in the Westerlies, Dinah became an extratropical cyclone late on August 1. The nontropical cyclone moved off the east, eventually crossing the International Date Line.

=== Typhoon Ed ===
- Typhoon (JMA)
- Category 3 typhoon (SSHWS)
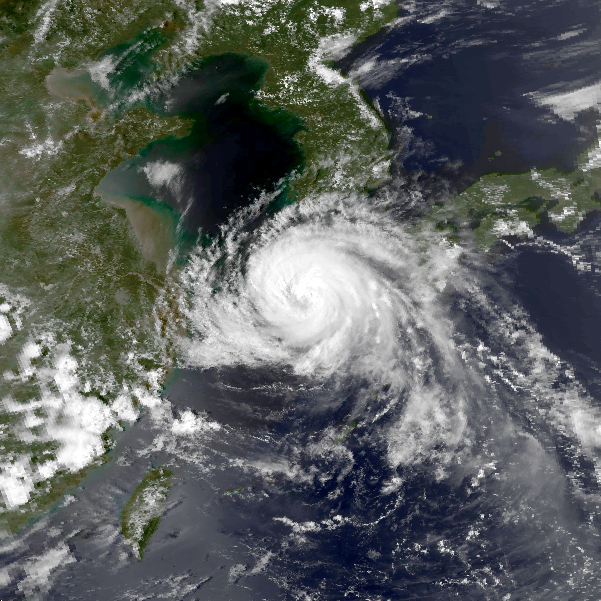
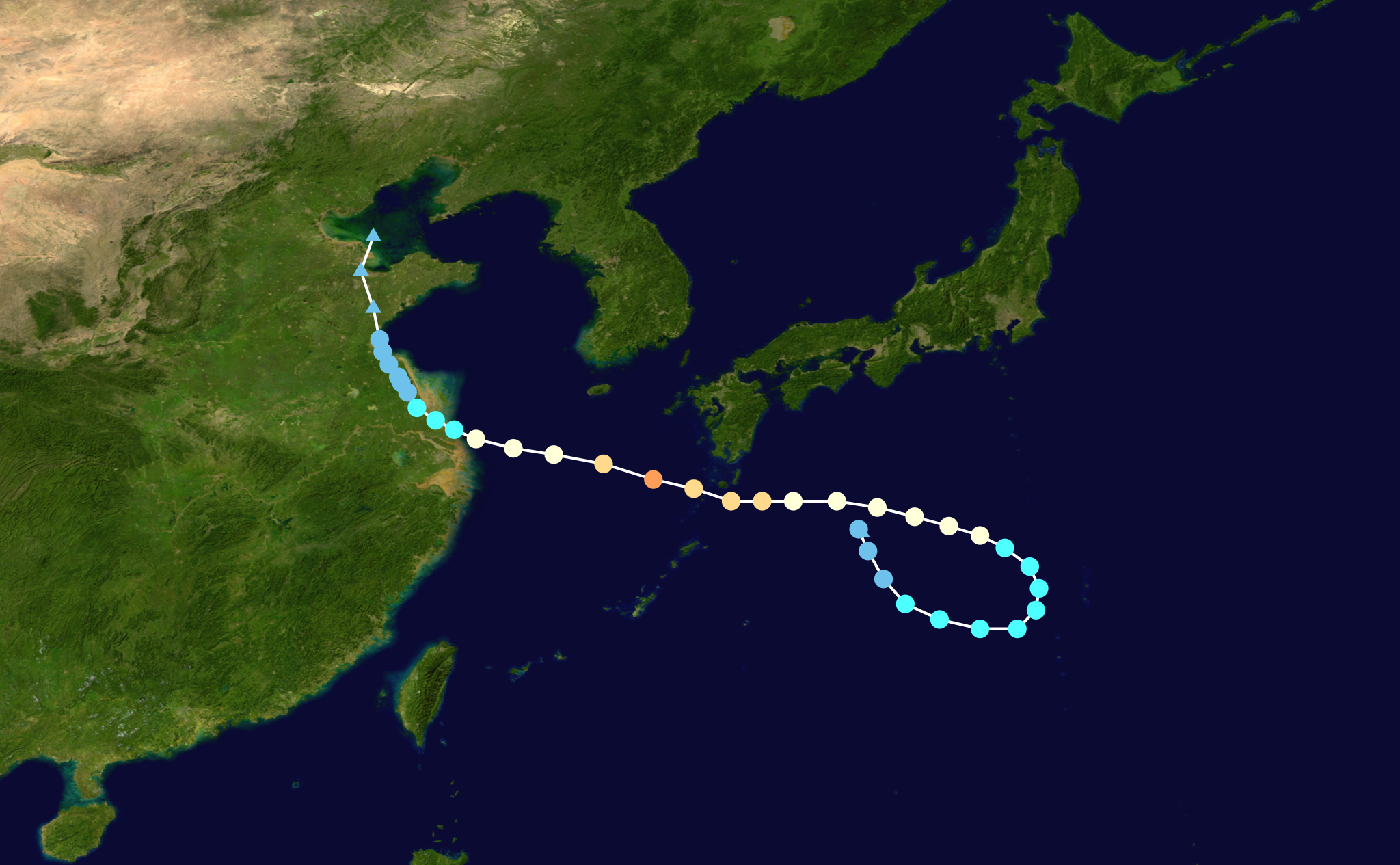
- Duration: July 24 – August 2
- Peak intensity: 150 km/h (90 mph) (10-min); 950 hPa (mbar)

Ed formed along the tail of a weakening cold front just south of Japan on July 23. It took a day to become detached on satellite pictures, and become a tropical disturbance. On the morning of July 25 a surface circulation had formed and the cyclone became a tropical depression. By July 26, it became a tropical storm. Initially it moved southeast during this period of strengthening as it approached Typhoon Dinah. As a shortwave trough in the Westerlies approached Ed, the cyclone turned north and moved away from Dinah. Ridging built in quickly behind the shortwave, and the cyclone turned west-northwest; a course it would maintain until landfall in mainland China. Strengthening continued, and Ed became an intense typhoon just south of Kyūshū. As it moved across the East China Sea, cooler waters and drier air led to weakening. Late on July 31, Ed made landfall 110 kilometres (68 mi) north of Shang-Hai as a strong tropical storm. Turning northwest after landfall, Ed moved along the Chinese coast and gradually weakened. By late on August 1, it had dissipated as a tropical cyclone. The Korean ship Ishlin Glory sank in the Korea Strait on July 29, which led to one death and 11 others declared missing. The launch of the weather satellite GMS-3 was delayed by this typhoon's passage nearby Japan.

=== Severe Tropical Storm Freda (Ditang) ===
- Severe tropical storm (JMA)
- Tropical storm (SSHWS)
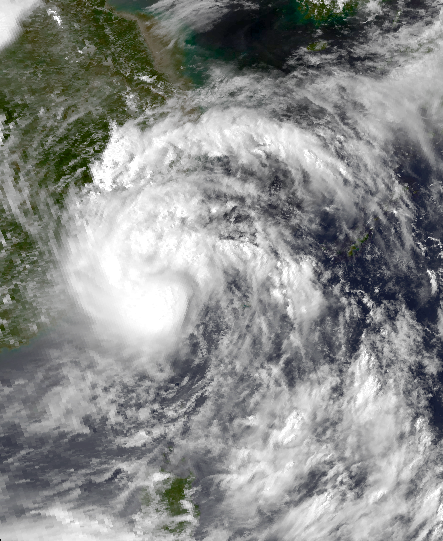
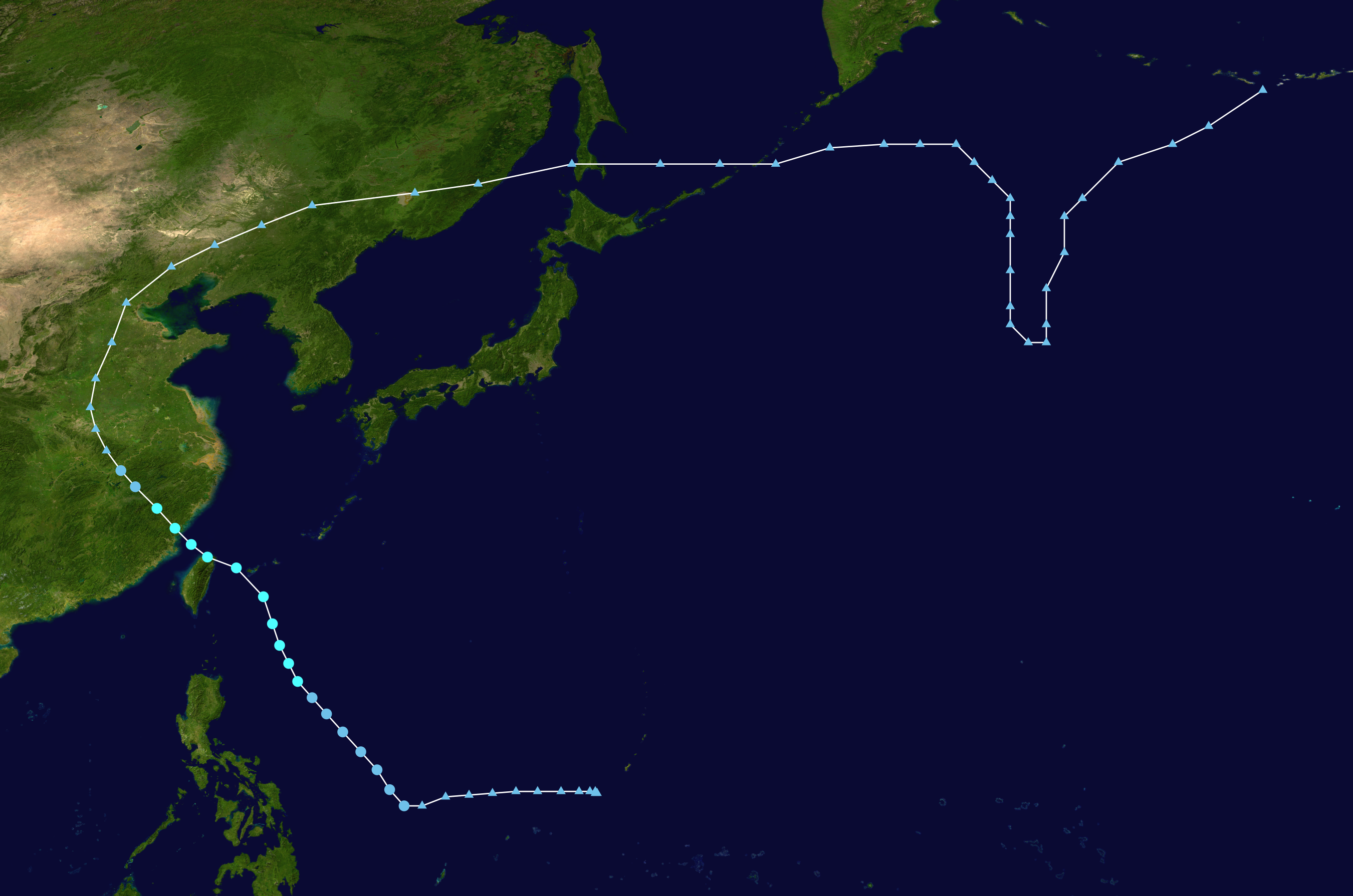
- Duration: August 4 – August 10
- Peak intensity: 95 km/h (60 mph) (10-min); 985 hPa (mbar)

The tail end of a trough extending southwest of Dinah west of Guam led to the development of this system. A tropical disturbance formed there on August 2 and developed a surface cyclone in the Philippine Sea later that day. A broad surface cyclone, the system tracked northwest and slowly developed. By late on August 5, it became a tropical depression. During the morning of August 6, it strengthened into a tropical storm while maintaining its broad center and a pair of circulation centers. The new northern center became dominant overnight. The system jumped northwest and quickly moved through the Formosa Straits before striking mainland China very early on August 8. Two died in Taiwan due to Freda. After two days inland, Freda finally dissipated as a tropical cyclone, but its cloud pattern remained identifiable for an additional day or two thereafter.

=== Tropical Depression 09W (Edeng-Gloring) ===
- Tropical depression (JMA)
- Tropical depression (SSHWS)
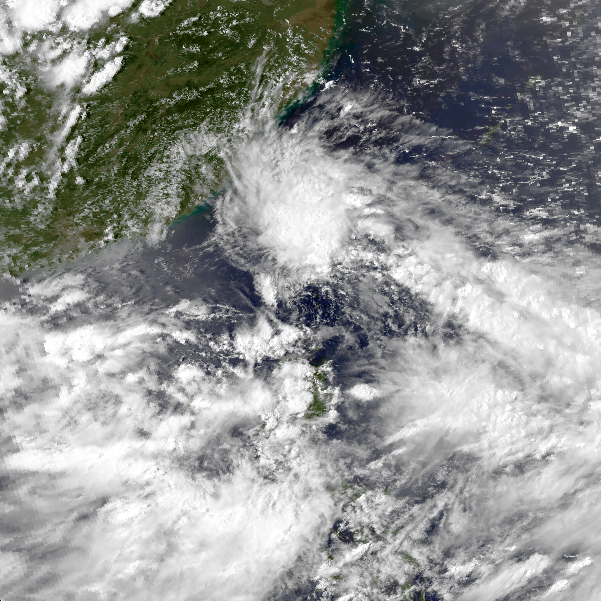
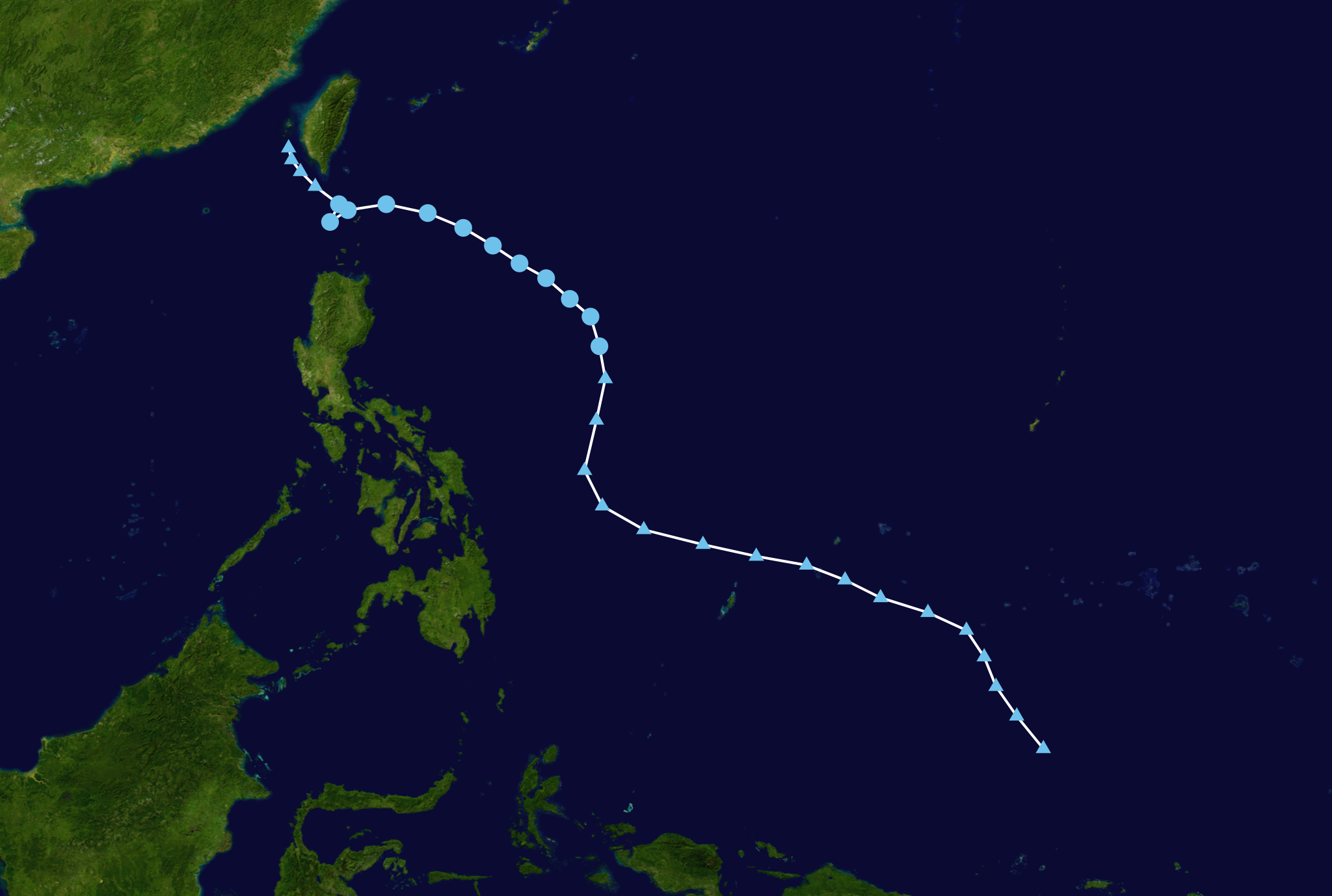
- Duration: August 11 – August 13
- Peak intensity: 55 km/h (35 mph) (10-min); 996 hPa (mbar)

A broad surface low formed in the near equatorial trough on August 7 about 1,225 kilometres (761 mi) south of Guam. Moving northwest, the disturbance slowly organized as it moved into the southeast portion of the monsoon trough. On August 10, the low jogged northward for a day towards an upper-level low northwest of Taiwan. Late on August 11, the low became a tropical depression, which was named Edeng by PAGASA and designated 09W by the Joint Typhoon Warning Center. It then moved west-northwest along the northern side of the monsoon trough as a sheared system due to moderate southerly flow aloft. A new circulation center developed, which led to PAGASA renaming the system Gloring as it neared the southern coast of Taiwan. The depression ultimately merged with a low-pressure area over the South China Sea, which would develop into Tropical Storm Gerald.

=== Severe Tropical Storm Gerald (Huaning) ===
- Severe tropical storm (JMA)
- Tropical storm (SSHWS)
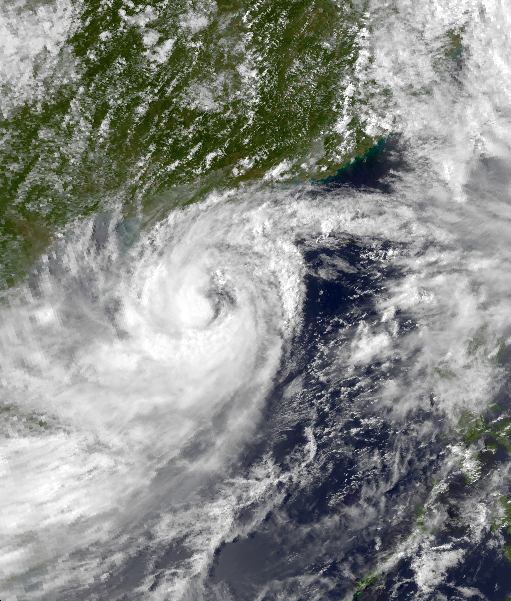
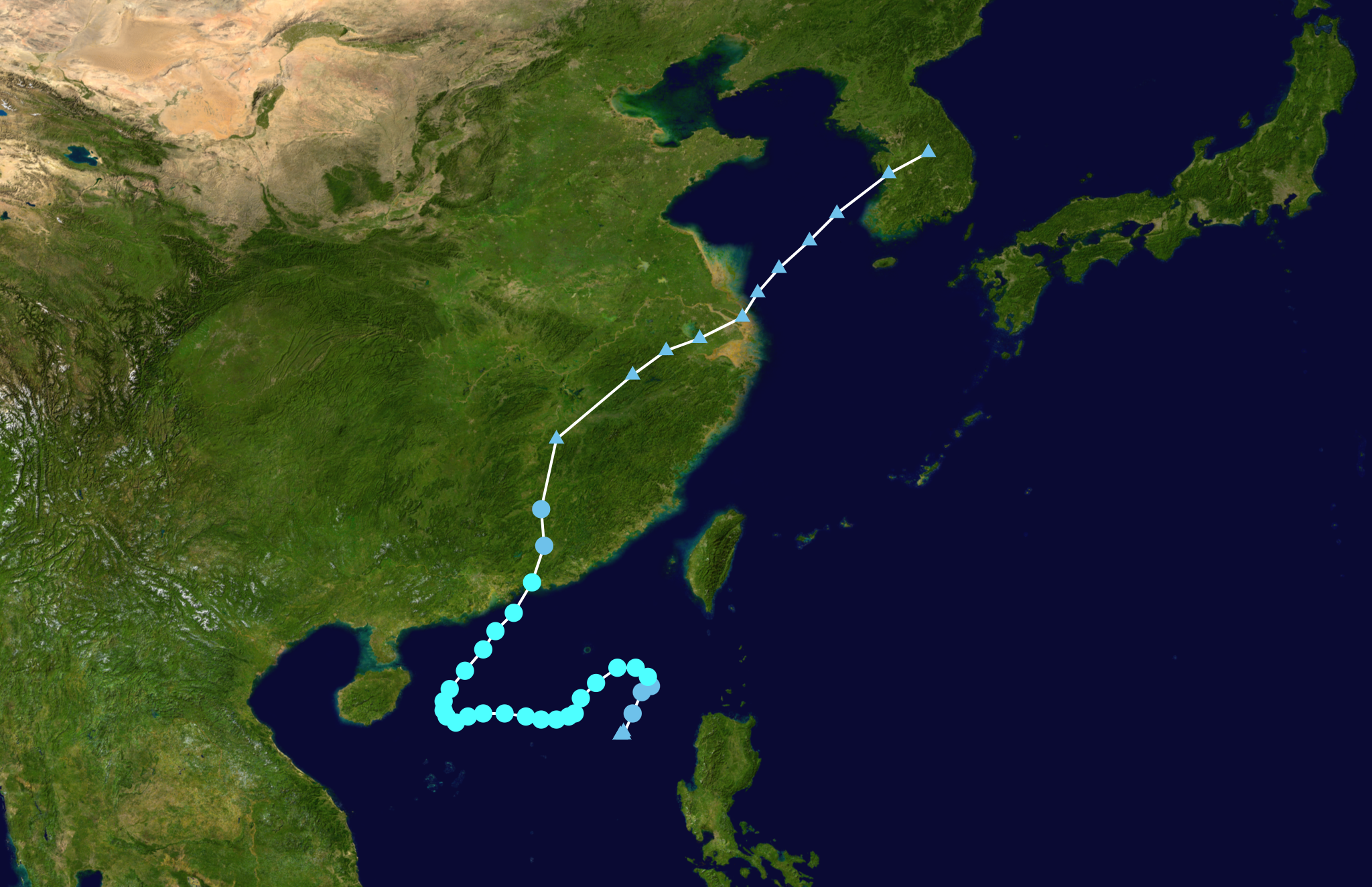
- Duration: August 15 – August 22
- Peak intensity: 100 km/h (65 mph) (10-min); 980 hPa (mbar)

Gerald formed within the monsoon trough in the northern South China Sea, where it meandered for its existence. The initial surface low formed on August 12 near 18N 117E. Slow development continued, and when the remains of Tropical Depression 09W/Gloring became absorbed by this cyclone, thunderstorm activity increased significantly. The system was a monsoon depression, with a central pressure of 997 hectopascals (29.4 inHg) and winds of up to 30 knots (56 km/h) a bit to the south of the circulation center. The storm's maximum sustained winds began to migrate closer to the center, and it became a tropical storm on the morning of August 16. Drifting west, Gerald slowly intensified for the next couple days. As Holly developed east of Taiwan, its outflow sheared Gerald, keeping the system from becoming a typhoon. Holly's proximity led to Gerald completing a small cyclonic loop on August 17. As Holly turned northwest, Gerald drifted westward once again. By August 20, Holly's large circulation over the East China Sea lured Gerald northeast. Shearing again increased, weakening Gerald. The cyclone made landfall 95 kilometres (59 mi) east-northeast of Hong Kong as a tropical depression. Winds gusted to 62 knots (115 km/h) at Tate's Cairn. Once inland, it turned to the north and weakened rapidly.

=== Typhoon Holly (Isang) ===
- Typhoon (JMA)
- Category 1 typhoon (SSHWS)
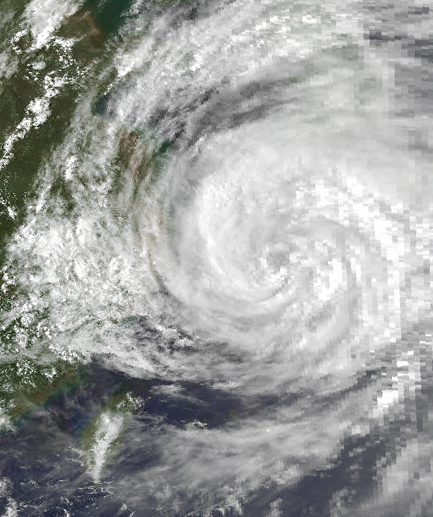
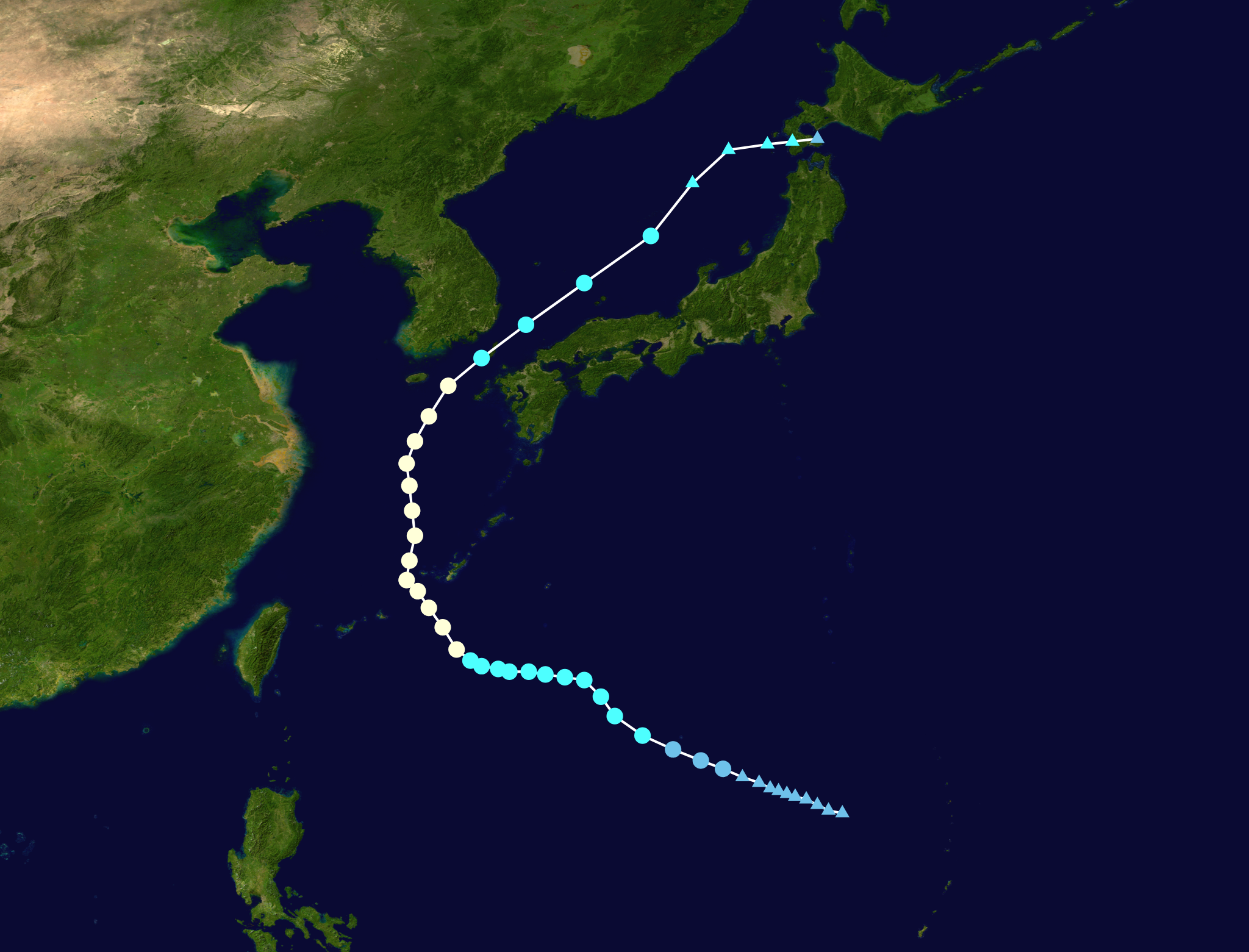
- Duration: August 15 – August 22
- Peak intensity: 130 km/h (80 mph) (10-min); 960 hPa (mbar)

This system formed in the eastern end of the monsoon trough that spawned Gerald. A very large cyclone, it did not close off a wind circulation until it achieved tropical storm strength on the morning of August 16. Like Freda and TD 09W, it had a broad center with light winds for much of its life cycle. Kadena Air Force Base, on Okinawa, measured 425 millimetres (16.7 in) of rainfall from this cyclone, and two periods of winds exceeding 50 knots (93 km/h) on August 18, and then again late August 19 and early August 20. The cyclone moved westward under the base of the subtropical ridge and reached typhoon strength on the morning of August 18. The system turned northwest and then north around the ridge's periphery at a relatively slow speed. As the system turned northeast and accelerated out of the East China Sea into the Korea Strait, it led to considerable damage in the Korean peninsula and across Kyūshū. One perished, eleven were injured, and nine went missing. Miyazake, on Kyūshū, measured 381 millimetres (15.0 in) of rainfall in a 24‑hour period during Holly's passage. This rainfall led to flooding and landslides. Interaction with nearby landmasses began to weaken Holly, and interaction with a mid-level trough led to its extratropical transition. Holly became an extratropical cyclone as it approached Hokkaidō early on August 23.

=== Tropical Depression 12W (Lusing) ===
- Tropical depression (PAGASA)
- Tropical depression (SSHWS)
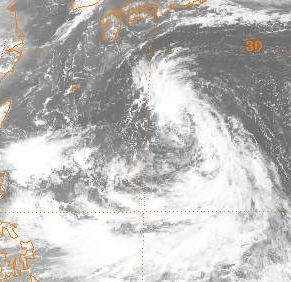
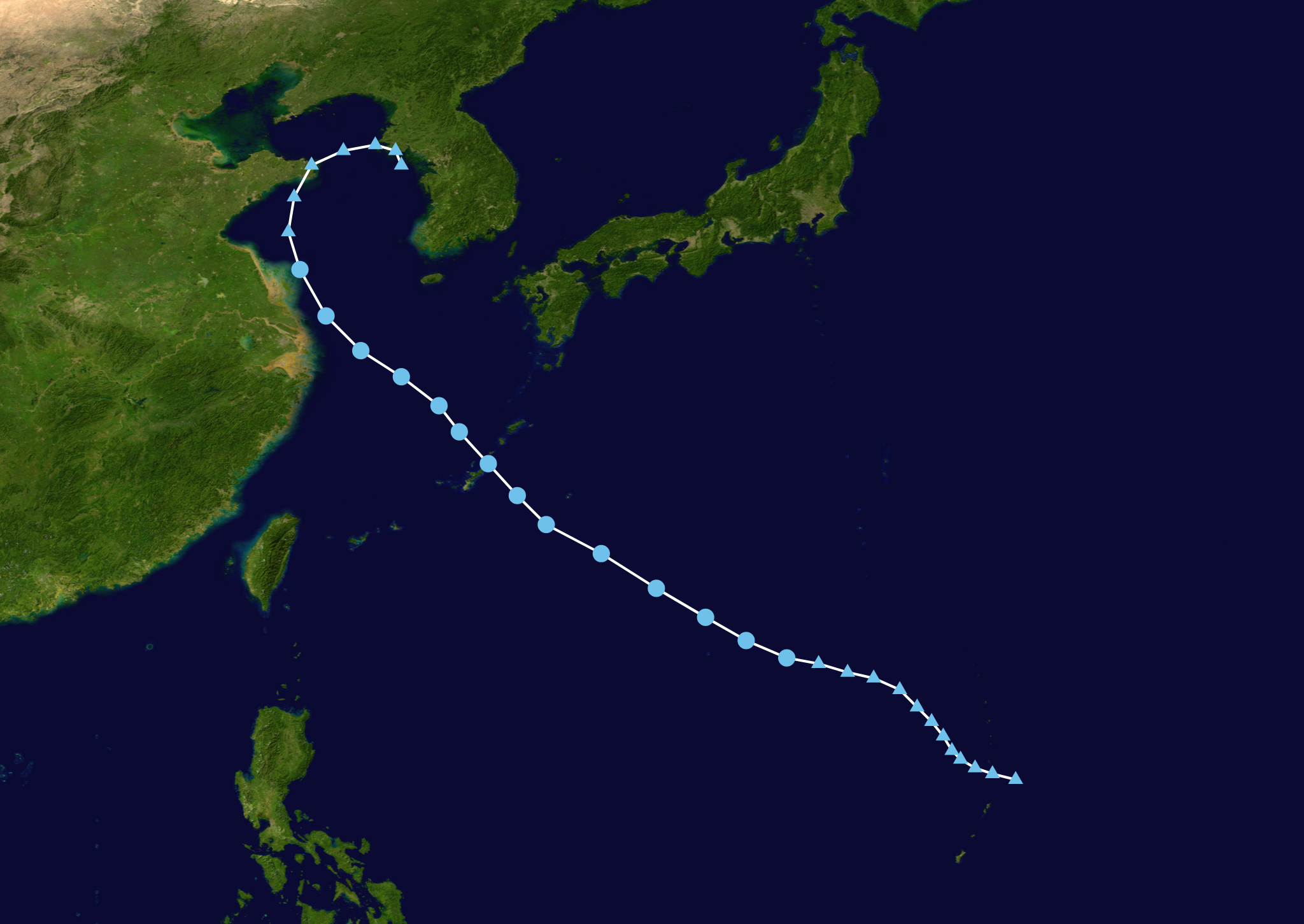
- Duration: August 23 – August 25
- Peak intensity: 35 km/h (25 mph) (10-min); 995 hPa (mbar)

Convection formed in the eastern end of the monsoon trough just north of Guam on August 20, leading to the formation of a weak low-pressure area by late morning August 21. The system slowly consolidated as it moved northwest, and was separating from the monsoon trough on August 23. Although convection increased in organization, the surface wind field did not respond. Nevertheless, it was deemed a tropical depression on the morning of August 24. By the next morning, the surface circulation became exposed as upper-level conditions worsened due to strong southerlies aloft. The cyclone was no longer deemed tropical at that time. The surface cyclone moved northwest, crossing the Ryūkyū Islands before it merged with a frontal zone in the northern East China Sea late on August 26.

=== Typhoon Ike (Nitang) ===
- Very strong typhoon (JMA)
- Category 4 typhoon (SSHWS)
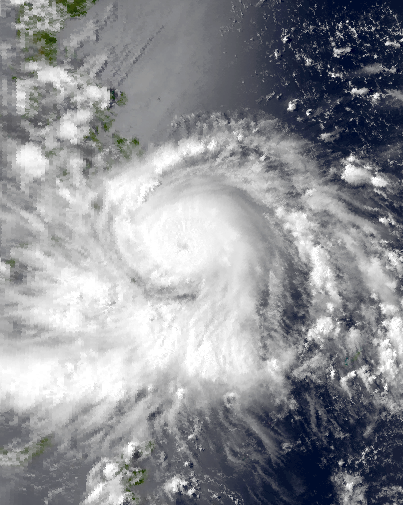
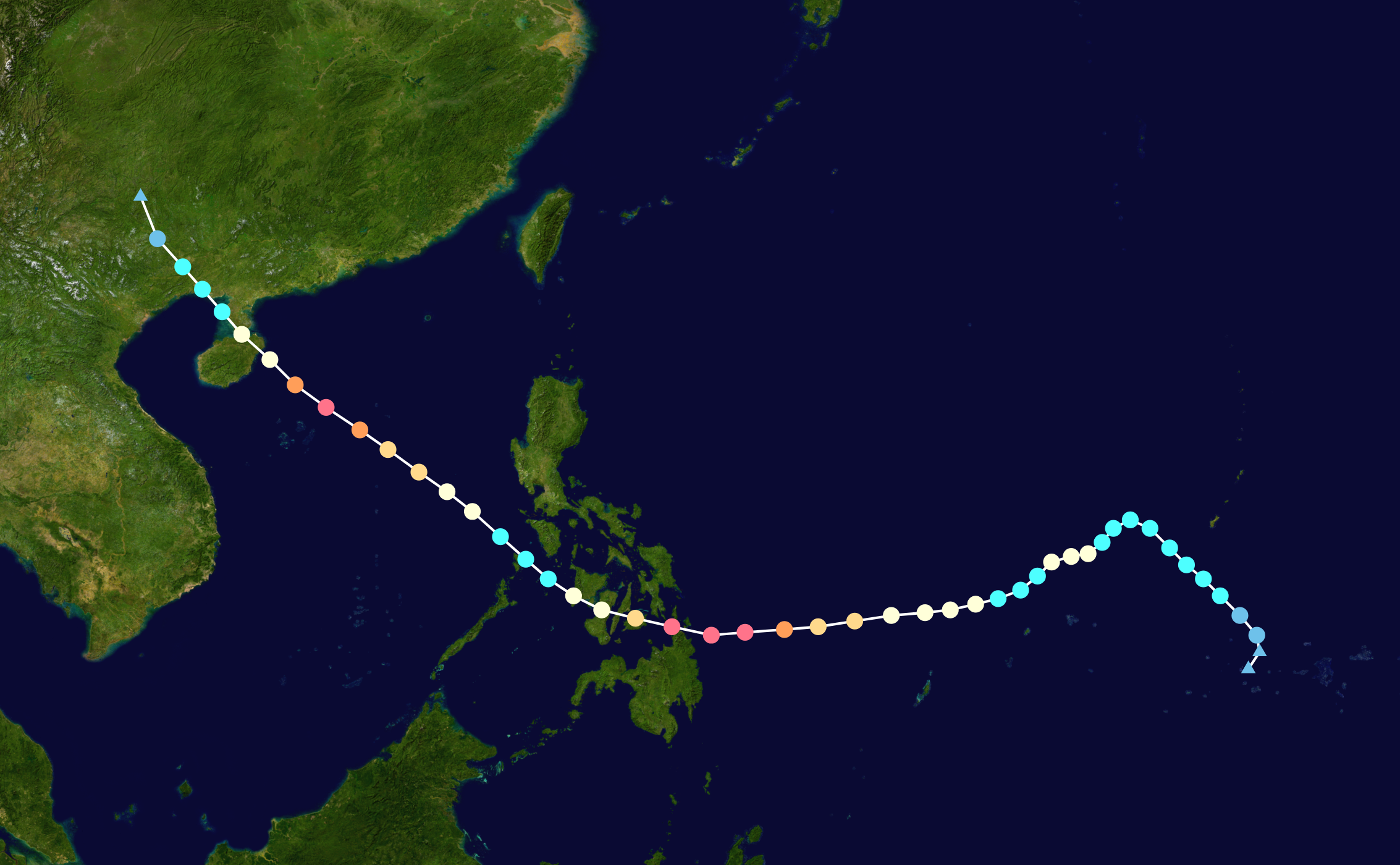
- Duration: August 26 – September 6
- Peak intensity: 165 km/h (105 mph) (10-min); 950 hPa (mbar)

This tropical cyclone formed on August 27 in the Philippine Sea, and strengthened as it moved westward into the southern Philippines, becoming a typhoon on August 31. Typhoon Ike caused extreme wind and flooding damage when it crossed the Philippines, resulting in 1492 fatalities, one of the Philippines' worst natural disaster in modern times, and its worst typhoon since Amy struck the archipelago in 1951. A total of 200,000 to 480,000 were left homeless. Emerging from the Philippines as a strong tropical storm, Ike restrengthened as it tracked northwest through the South China Sea across northeast Hainan Island. Weakening back into a tropical storm, Ike moving inland into mainland China. In Hong Kong, winds gusted to 49 knots (91 km/h) at Tate's Cairn. Extensive crop damage was experienced in southern China, with Ike becoming the most significant tropical cyclone to strike Guangxi since 1954. Total damage was reportedly US$111 million (1984 dollars). The name Ike was retired after this season.

=== Typhoon June (Maring) ===
- Typhoon (JMA)
- Tropical storm (SSHWS)
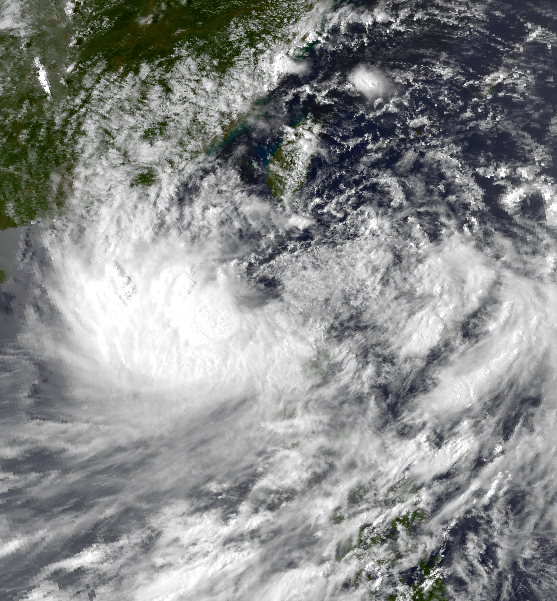
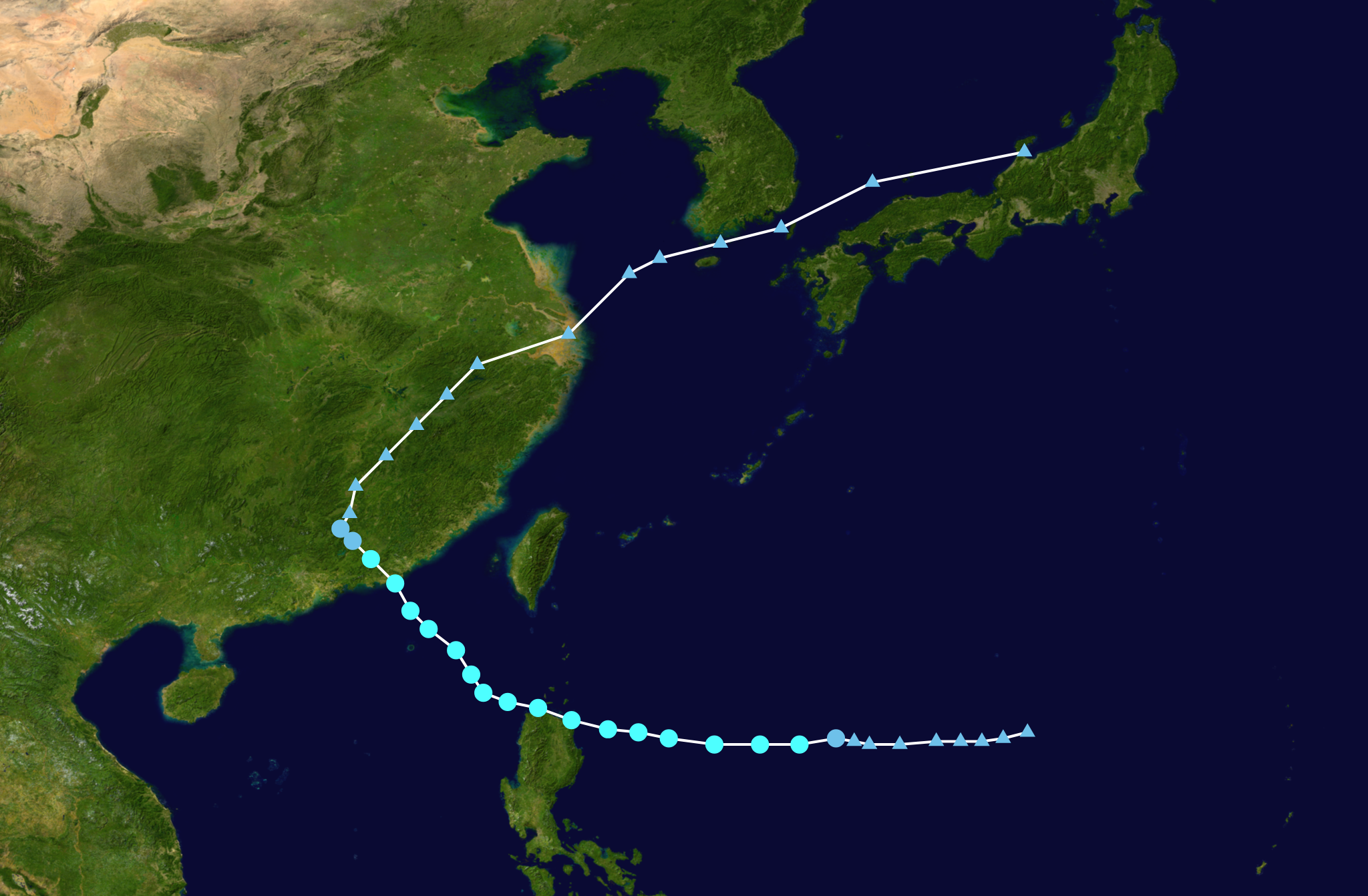
- Duration: August 26 – September 1
- Peak intensity: 120 km/h (75 mph) (10-min); 985 hPa (mbar)

A surface low formed within the monsoon trough on August 25. The low drifted westward as convection tried to consolidate around the center. Strong upper level wind shear inhibited development for the next couple of days. It took until late on August 28 for a single circulation center to consolidate, and when it did, gale-force winds around the center forced an upgrade from a monsoon depression to a tropical storm about 200 kilometres (120 mi) east of Luzon. Moving westward, it struck Luzon early on August 29. By late morning, the system turned west-northwest over the mountainous island, emerging into the South China Sea. A total of 121 lives were taken by June across the Philippines, and damage totaled US$5 million (1984 dollars.) A weakness in the subtropical ridge to its north led to a turn to the northwest, and the system made landfall 240 kilometres (150 mi) east of Hong Kong. Winds gusted to 38 knots (70 km/h) at Tate's Cairn, and total rainfall at Cheung Chau reached 187.3 millimetres (7.37 in). When Tropical Storm June hit southeast China on August 30, 67 people were reported dead due to extensive flooding from June's broad circulation.

=== Tropical Depression Moke ===
- Tropical depression (JMA)
- Subtropical storm (SSHWS)
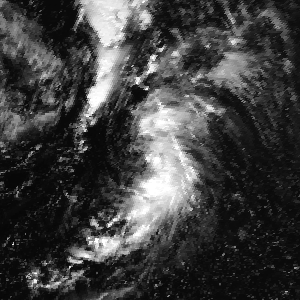
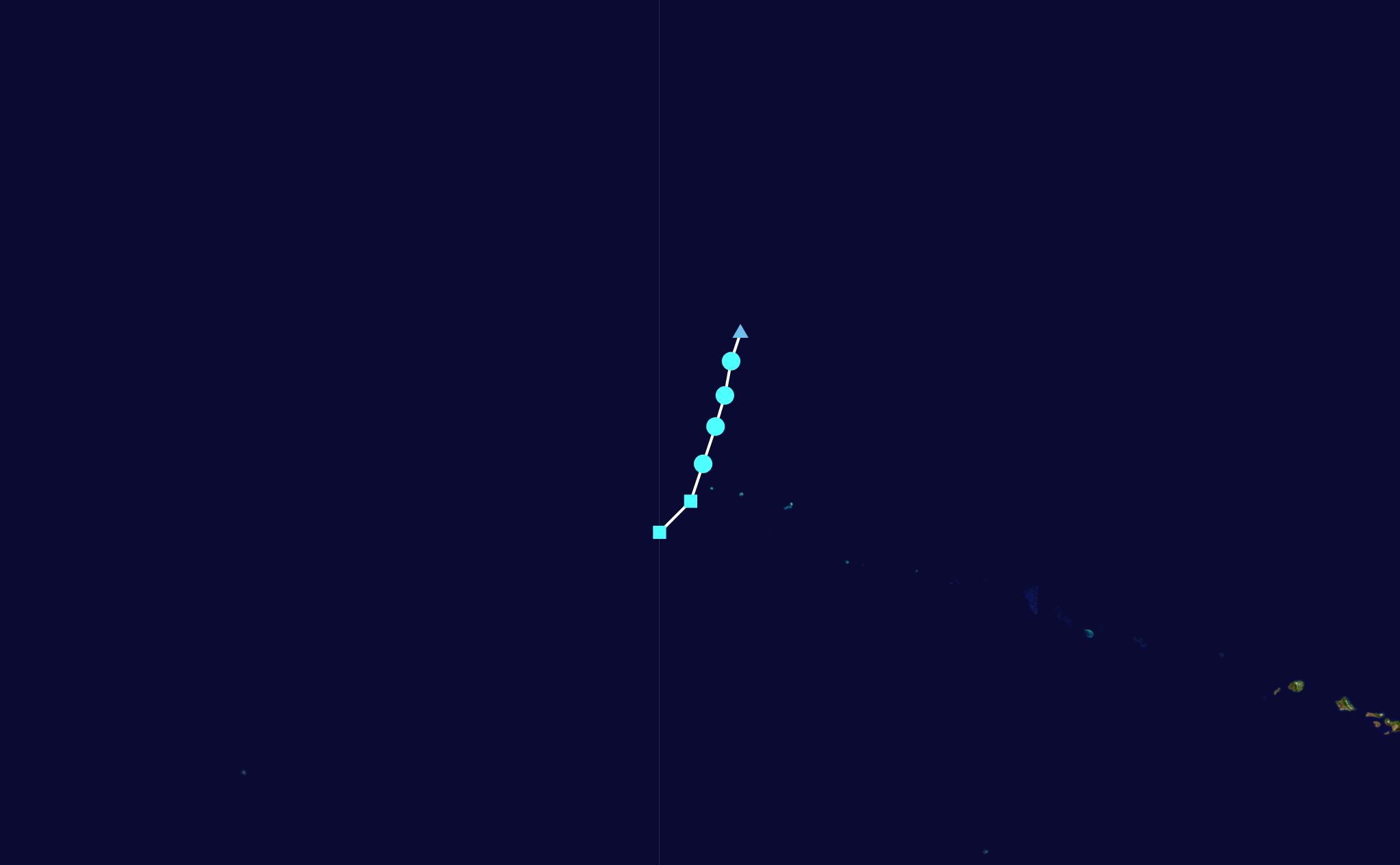
- Duration: September 2 – September 3 (Exited basin)
- Peak intensity: 65 km/h (40 mph) (1-min); 1004 hPa (mbar)

JMA declared that a depression formed from a cold-core low on September 2. Moving eastwards, it crossed the International Date Line on the next day. Just after crossing it strengthened into a tropical storm, thus receiving the name Moke from the Central Pacific Hurricane Center.

=== Typhoon Kelly ===
- Typhoon (JMA)
- Category 1 typhoon (SSHWS)
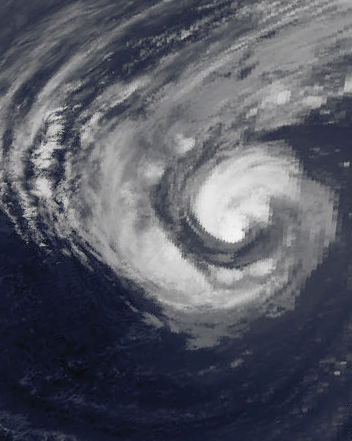
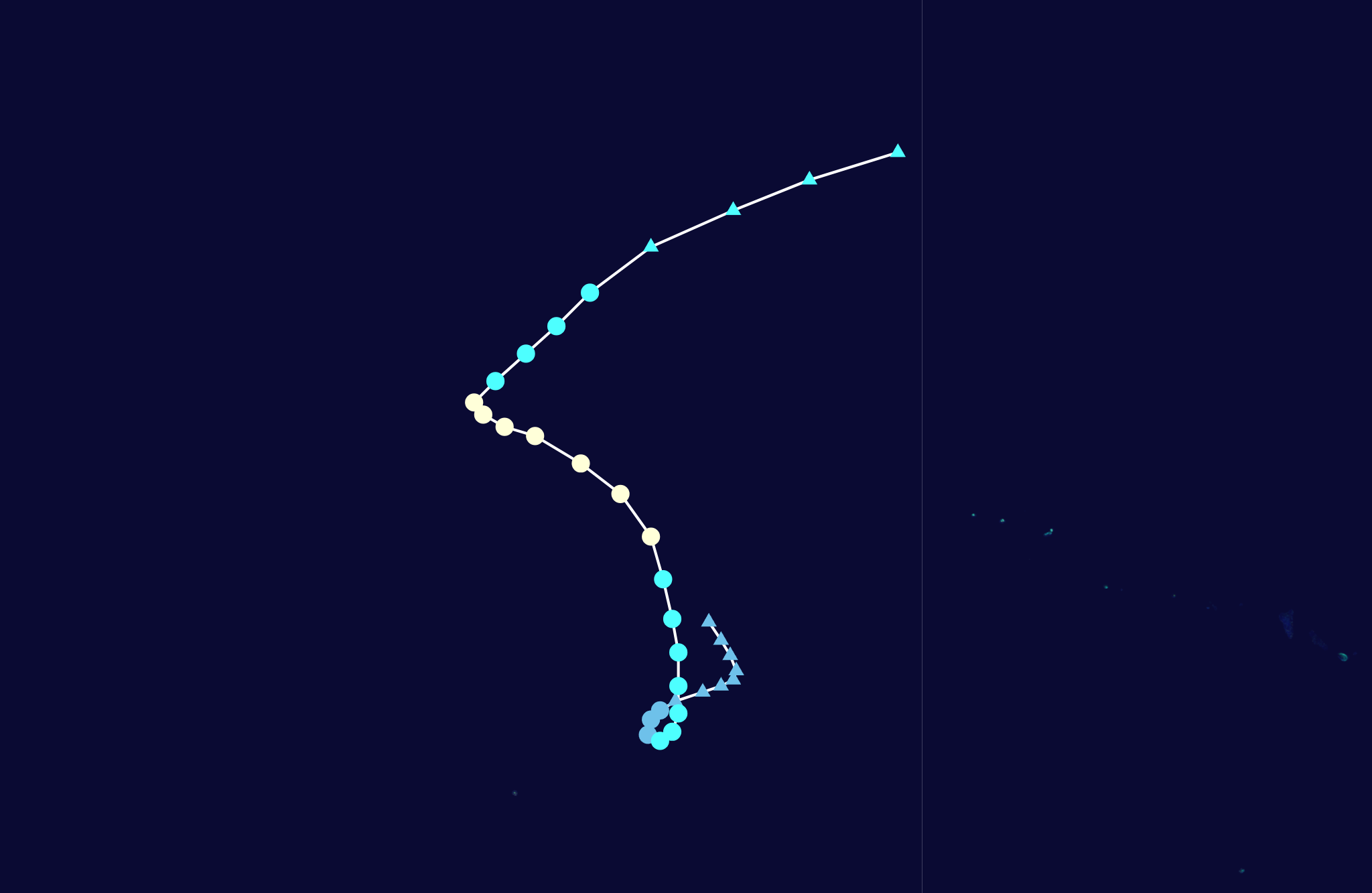
- Duration: September 13 – September 19
- Peak intensity: 130 km/h (80 mph) (10-min); 965 hPa (mbar)

Developing at the southern end of a shear line, a low level circulation formed on September 13 with increasing convective organization to the south of a cold core cyclone. Completing a cyclonic loop, the cyclone continued to develop despite cool air becoming entrained within its circulation. Approaching the upper-level low, Kelly slowed down its northward motion and reached its maximum intensity. Soon afterwards, it rapidly accelerated northeast. Losing its tropical character late on September 17, it became an extratropical cyclone on the morning of September 18. This cyclone continued moving northeast for another few days, past the International Date Line and into the Gulf of Alaska.

=== Tropical Storm Lynn ===
- Tropical storm (JMA)
- Tropical storm (SSHWS)
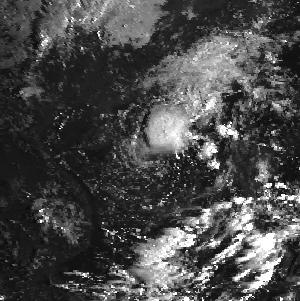
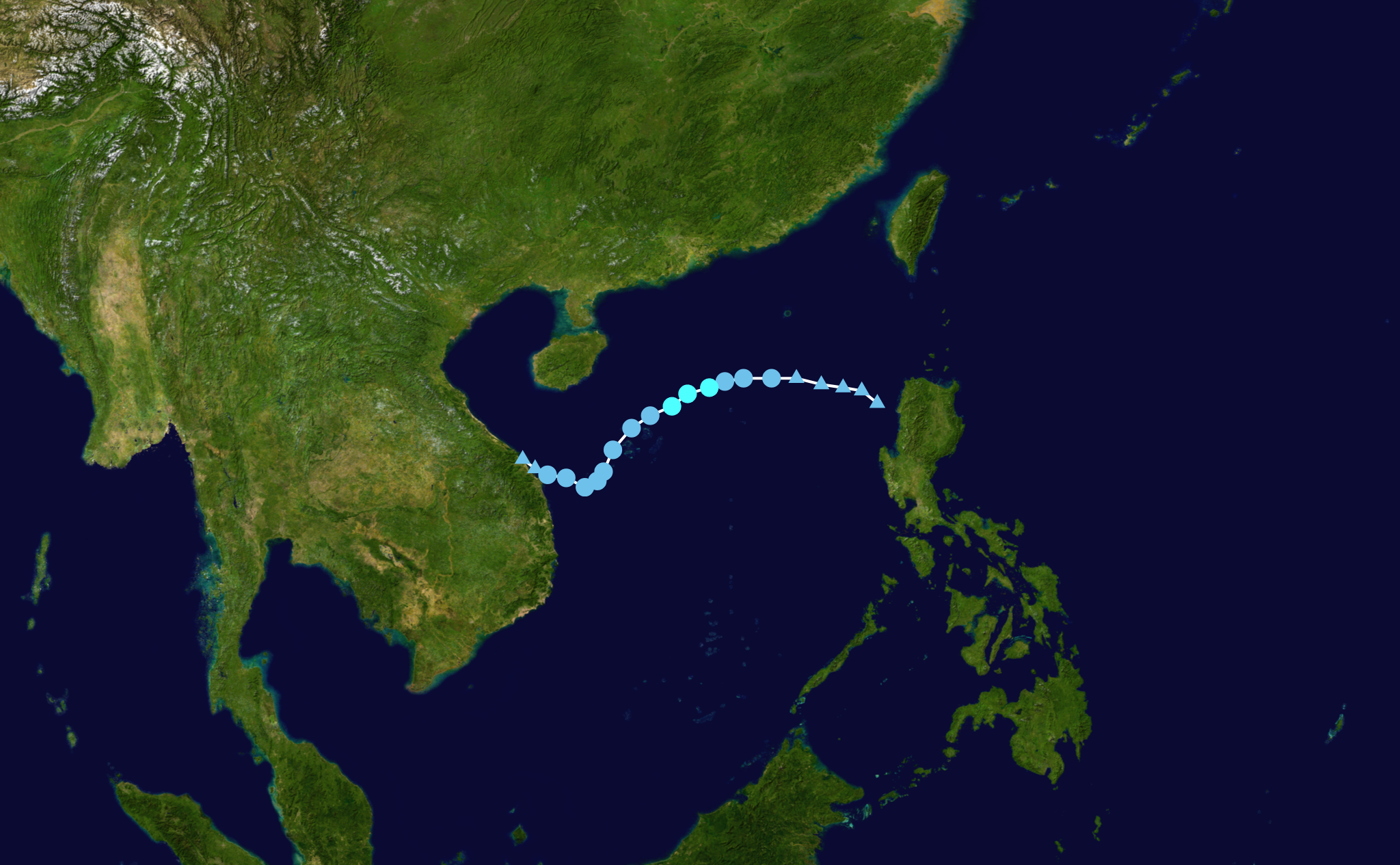
- Duration: September 23 – September 27
- Peak intensity: 85 km/h (50 mph) (10-min); 998 hPa (mbar)

First noted as an area of poorly organized thunderstorms near Guam on September 19, the disturbance moved westward across the northern Philippine Sea. As an upper tropospheric cyclone weakened east of Luzon on September 22, upper-level conditions improved, but no reflection at the surface was yet witnessed. The thunderstorms entered the South China Sea on September 23 while a lee side surface low formed along the monsoon trough west of Luzon due to the strong easterly low-level flow. The disturbance rapidly consolidated, and it became a tropical depression early on September 24. Slowly intensifying as it moved west-northwest, Lynn became a tropical storm on September 25. At this point, the storm track became west-southwesterly and upper-level winds began to shear thunderstorms north of the center. Weakening ensued, and Lynn struggled to maintain tropical storm intensity as it made landfall about 95 kilometres (59 mi) southeast of Da Nang, Vietnam. The depression then turned northwest and dissipated near the Vietnam/Laos border early on September 28.

=== Severe Tropical Storm Maury ===
- Severe tropical storm (JMA)
- Tropical storm (SSHWS)
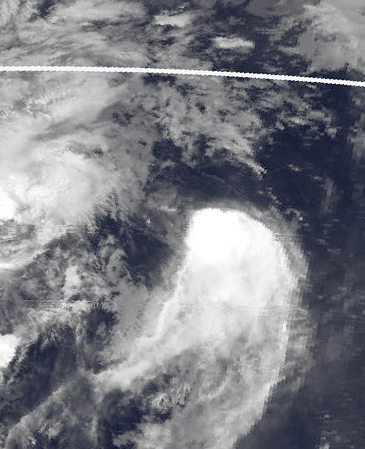
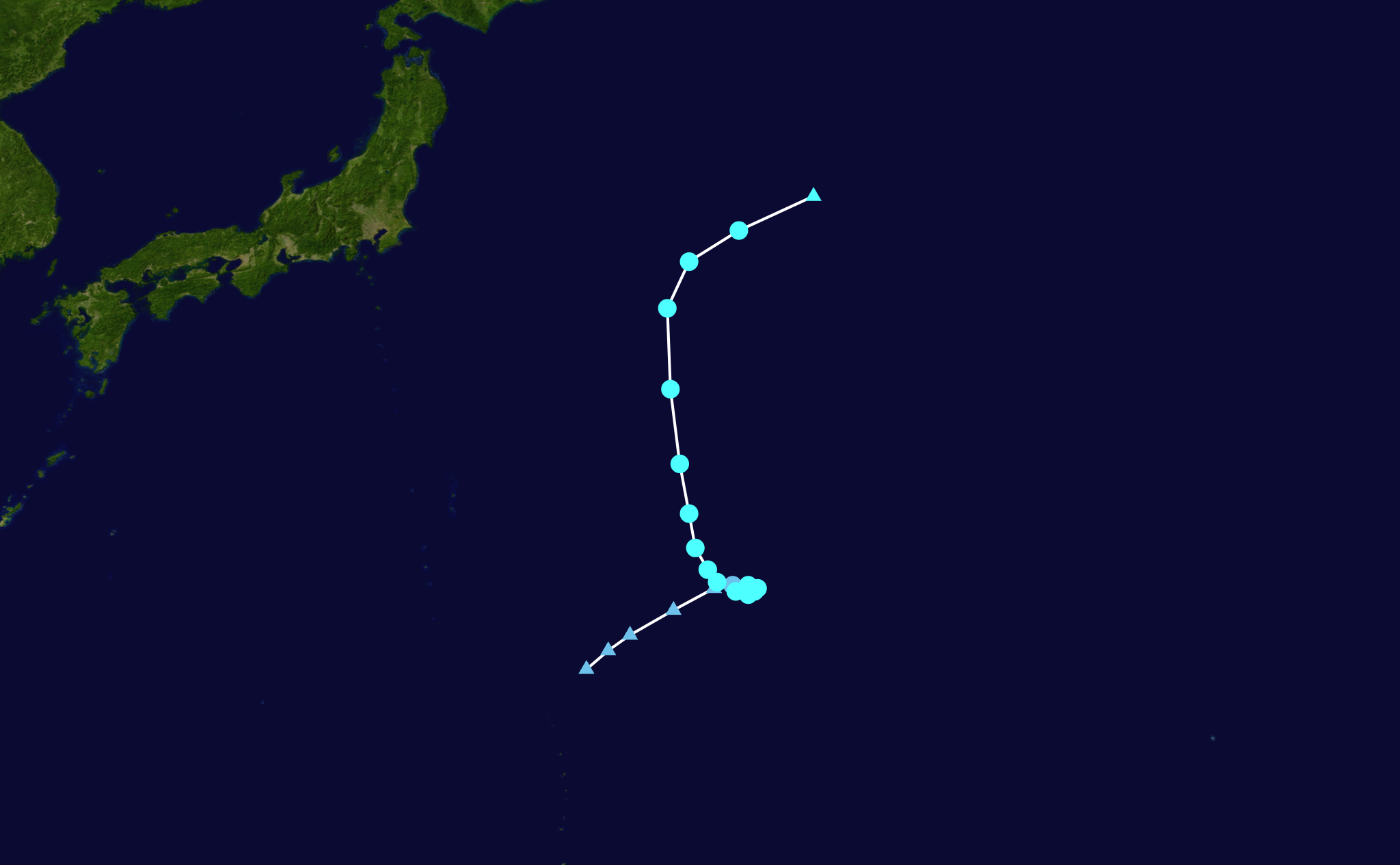
- Duration: September 26 – October 1
- Peak intensity: 95 km/h (60 mph) (10-min); 990 hPa (mbar)

The system formed near the intersection of the northeast end of the monsoon trough with a frontal boundary near Marcus Island just as Nina was developing 1300 km to its west on September 27. By early on September 28, it had become a tropical depression with tropical storm strength reached by noon as Maury moved north around Nina. Instead of recurving quickly around the subtropical ridge to its east and southeast, Maury slowed as it entered Nina's larger circulation. Nina absorbed Maury's circulation on October 1 as it overtook the storm from the southwest.

=== Tropical Storm Nina ===
- Tropical storm (JMA)
- Tropical storm (SSHWS)
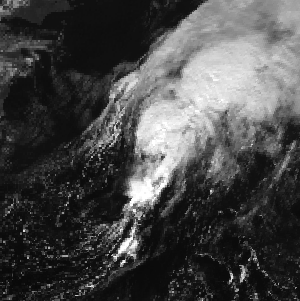
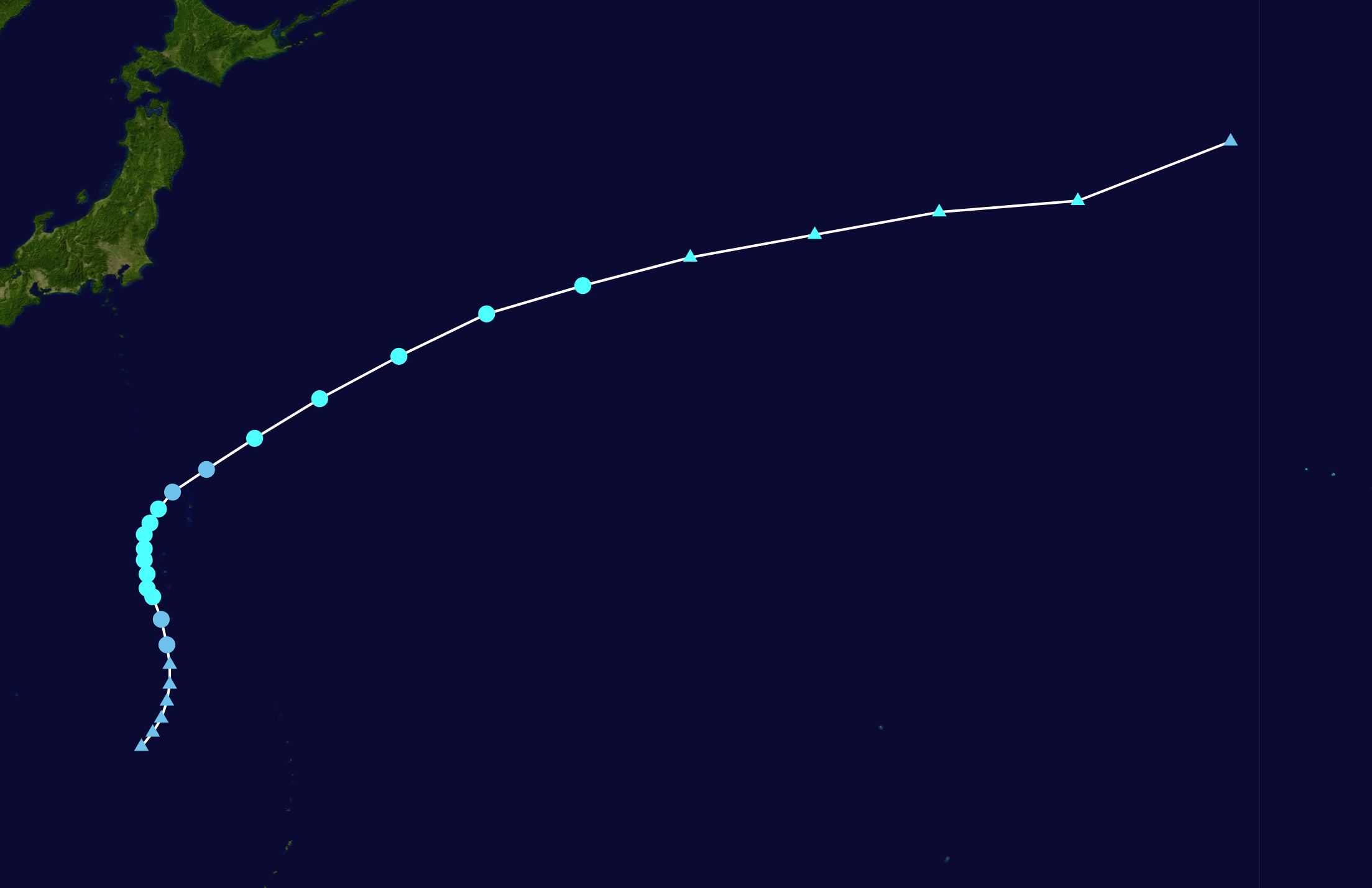
- Duration: September 27 – October 2
- Peak intensity: 85 km/h (50 mph) (10-min); 992 hPa (mbar)

Like Maury, Nina formed near the intersection of a frontal zone and the monsoon trough. On September 27, a circulation formed about 925 kilometres (575 mi) north-northwest of Guam. An upper level high north of Guam allowed for further development. Moving north, the system detached from the monsoon trough, and it became a tropical depression on September 28. Southerly shear across the system led to an initially subtropical appearance, as thunderstorms moved away from the center. This also prevented significant development. On September 29, the main belt of the Westerlies captured the cyclone, displacing thunderstorms even farther east of the center. With the low level circulation exposed, Nina weakened into a tropical depression. By late on September 30, the low level circulation moved back under the convection, which resulted in reintensification back to a tropical storm at the same time Maury was absorbed into its circulation. By late morning October 1, Nina reached its maximum intensity, but extratropical transition was already underway. Central convection decreased, and Nina became an extratropical cyclone by October 2.

=== Typhoon Ogden ===
- Typhoon (JMA)
- Category 1 typhoon (SSHWS)
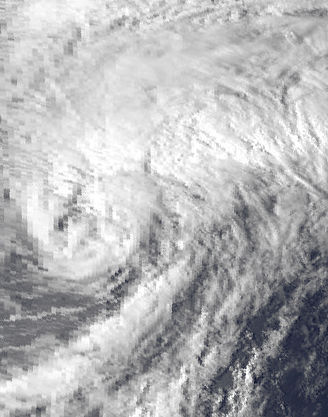
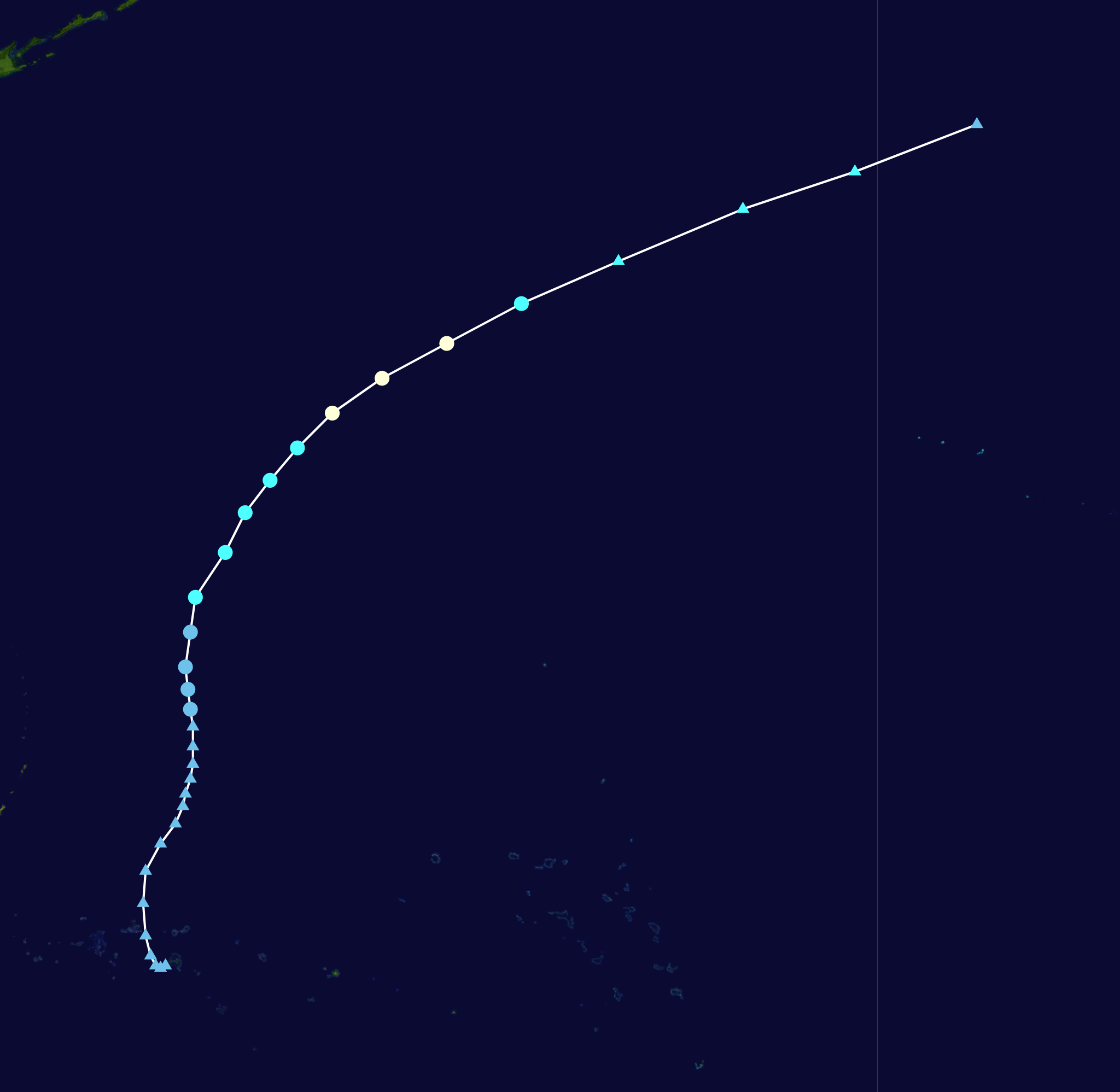
- Duration: October 7 – October 10
- Peak intensity: 120 km/h (75 mph) (10-min); 980 hPa (mbar)

A weak surface low formed west of Truk on October 3, which contained little thunderstorm activity. Moving northwest, it joined the eastern section of the monsoon trough. Following the flow around the east side of the trough towards the north, poorly organized convection became associated with the persistent low. Once it neared the northeast fringe of the trough, convective organization improved. Although still a very broad system, it became a tropical depression on the morning of October 7. Moving around the southwest part of a retreating subtropical ridge, Ogden sharply recurved. By early October 8, it strengthened into a tropical storm and passed just east of Marcus Island. The cyclone attained typhoon intensity partially due to translational motion as it began to undergo extratropical transition on October 9. Southwest shear began to significantly impact the system thereafter, which weakened the system into a tropical storm on October 10. By noon, the system had fully evolved into an extratropical cyclone. The nontropical storm continued northeast towards the International Date Line.

=== Typhoon Phyllis ===
- Typhoon (JMA)
- Category 1 typhoon (SSHWS)
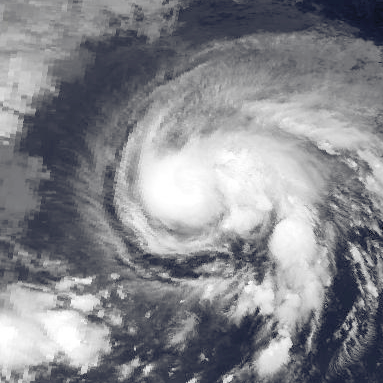
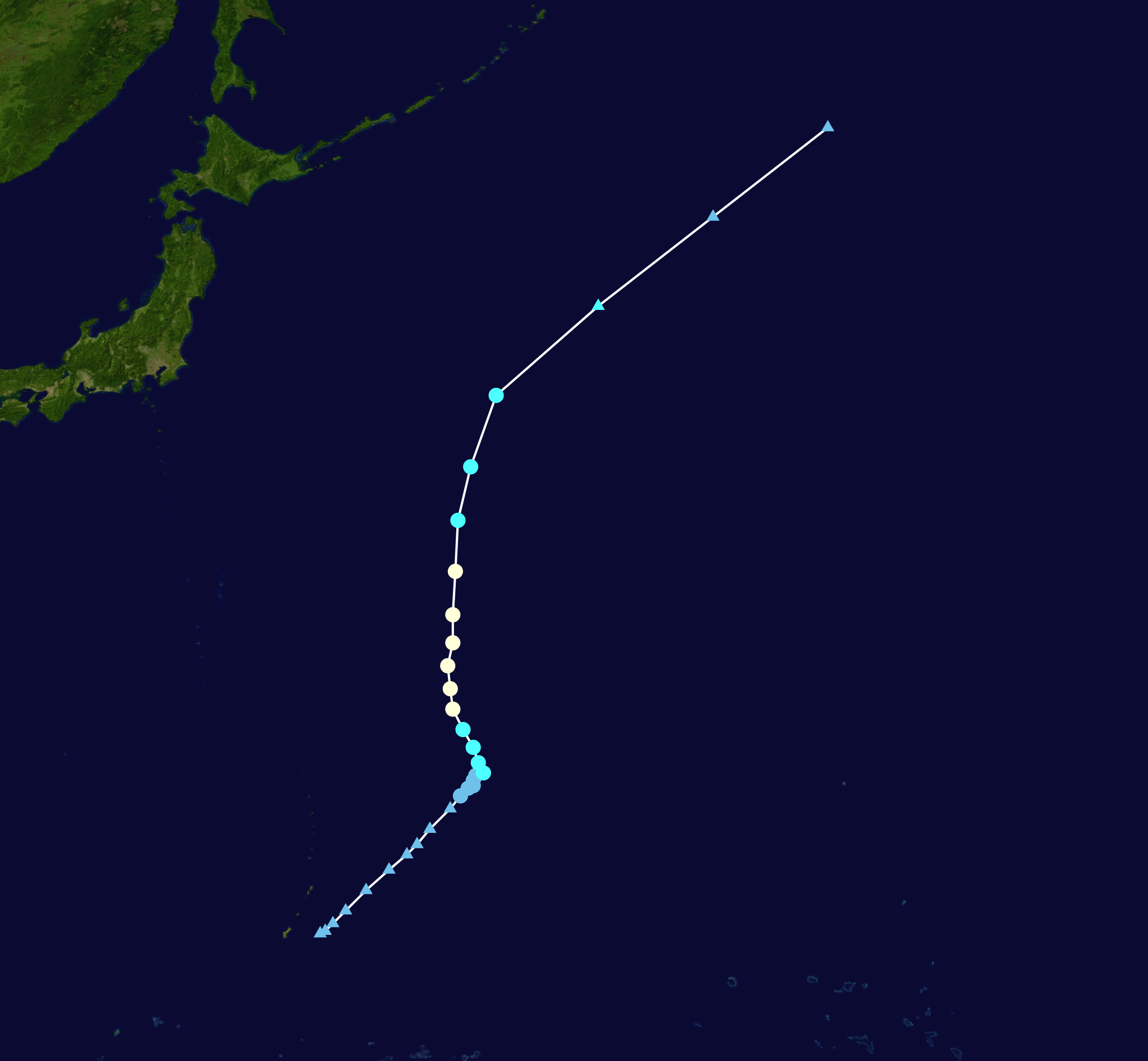
- Duration: October 9 – October 14
- Peak intensity: 120 km/h (75 mph) (10-min); 975 hPa (mbar)

Phyllis formed within a surface trough left behind by Ogden. By late on October 7, a surface low had formed east of Guam. The system drifted northeast. A compact system, the system became a tropical depression late on October 10 and a tropical storm on the morning of October 11. Northward acceleration had begun, and Phyllis became a typhoon the morning of October 12. A cut off low south of Honshū helped lead to strong southerly flow over Phyllis, which weakened the storm. The shear vector changed from southerly to easterly as the main belt of the Westerlies impacted the cyclone, which caused faster weakening. By the morning of October 14, Phyllis became a wave along the cold front approaching the system from the west.

=== Tropical Storm Roy ===
- Tropical storm (JMA)
- Tropical storm (SSHWS)
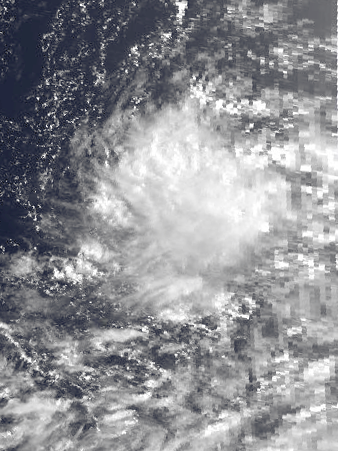
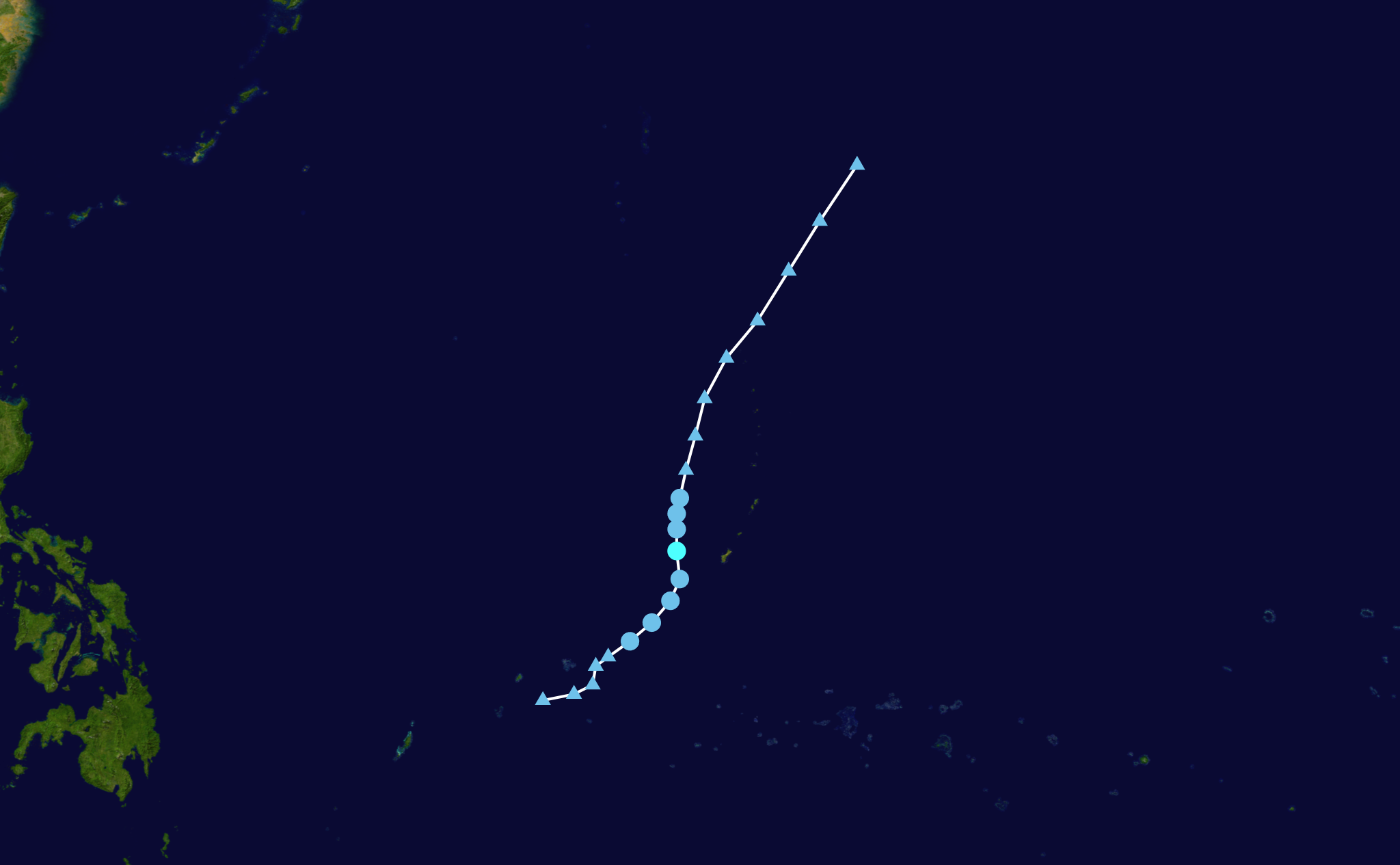
- Duration: October 9 – October 14
- Peak intensity: 75 km/h (45 mph) (10-min); 996 hPa (mbar)

Developing southwest of Guam as Phyllis was forming to its northeast, a weak circulation developed on October 9. Upper level wind shear from Ogden slowed development into October 10. Thereafter, convection became better organized with the system and it became a tropical depression by October 11. A compact system, it became a tropical storm later that morning. Strong upper level easterlies halted development due to vertical wind shear. The low-level monsoon flow became diverted from Roy to Phyllis, which removed a potential source of low-level vorticity. Roy was an exposed circulation center on October 12 with decreasing convection when its lowest central pressure was reached. By the morning of October 13, it lost its defined circulation center and had dissipated as a tropical cyclone.

=== Tropical Storm Susan ===
- Tropical storm (JMA)
- Tropical storm (SSHWS)
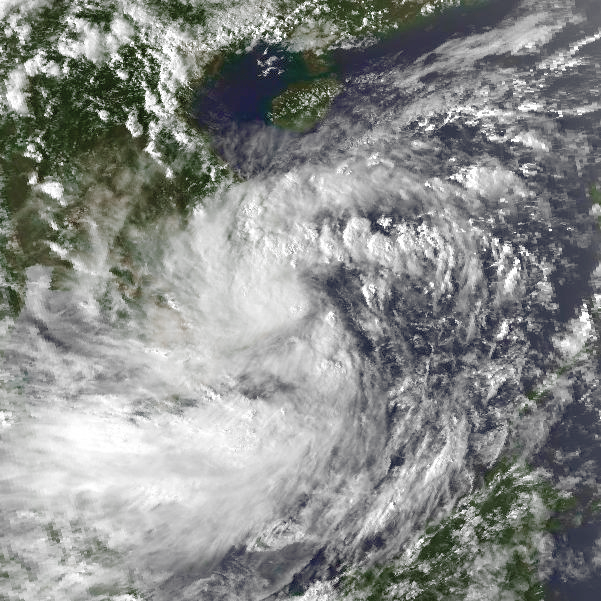
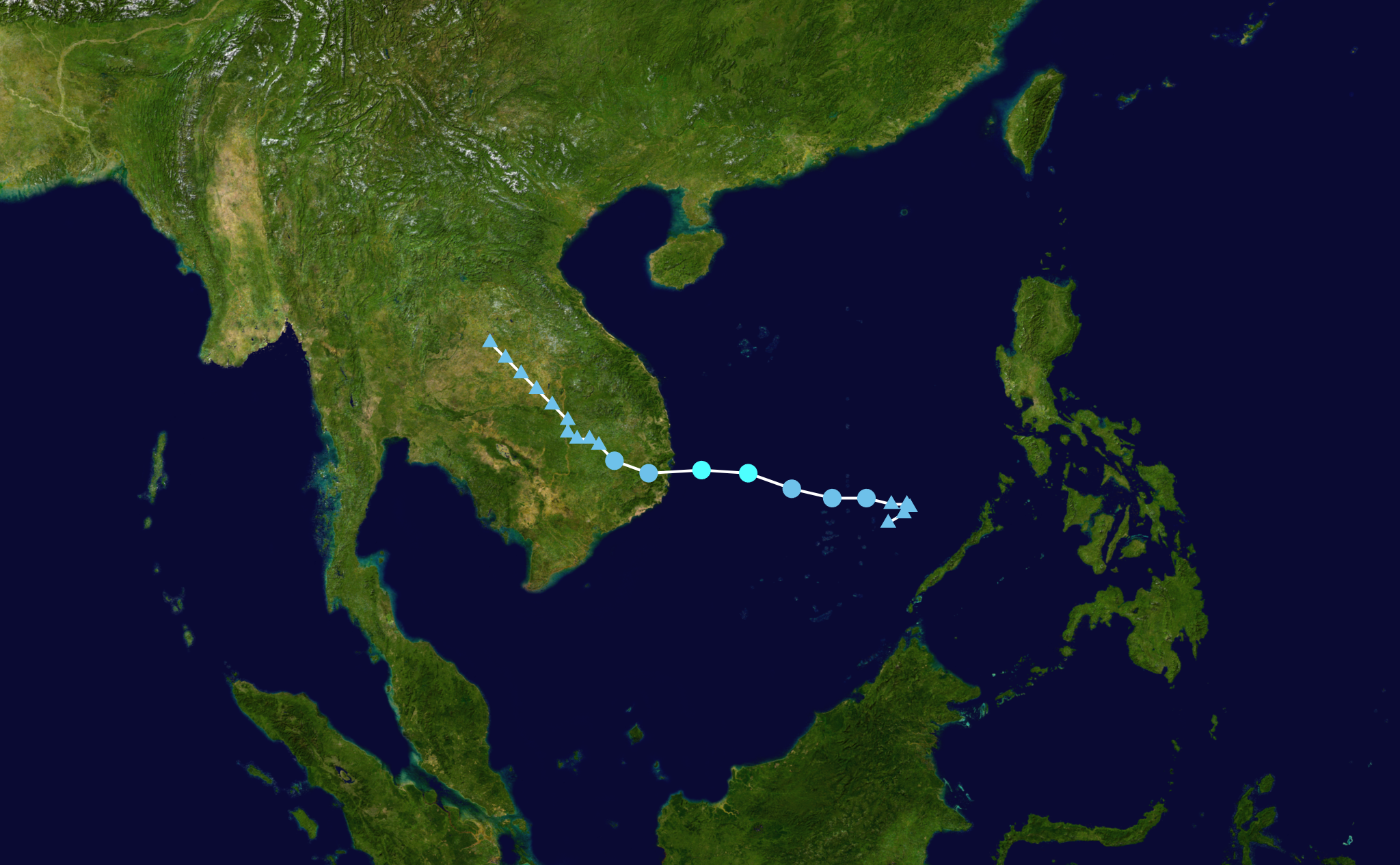
- Duration: October 10 – October 15
- Peak intensity: 75 km/h (45 mph) (10-min); 996 hPa (mbar)

On October 10, a circulation had formed in the central South China Sea. Slow to consolidate, the low accelerated west along the axis of the monsoon trough as it became a tropical depression late on October 11. Developing as it veered west-northwest, Susan became a minimal tropical storm as it made landfall just north of Nha Trang, Vietnam. The system turned northwest up the Mekong River valley, maintaining its identity as a convective area for the next three days. Extreme flooding struck eastern and central Vietnam on October 12 and caused 33 casualties and moderate crop damage.

=== Typhoon Thad ===
- Very strong typhoon (JMA)
- Category 4 typhoon (SSHWS)
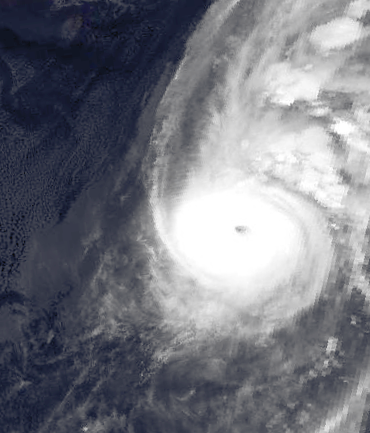
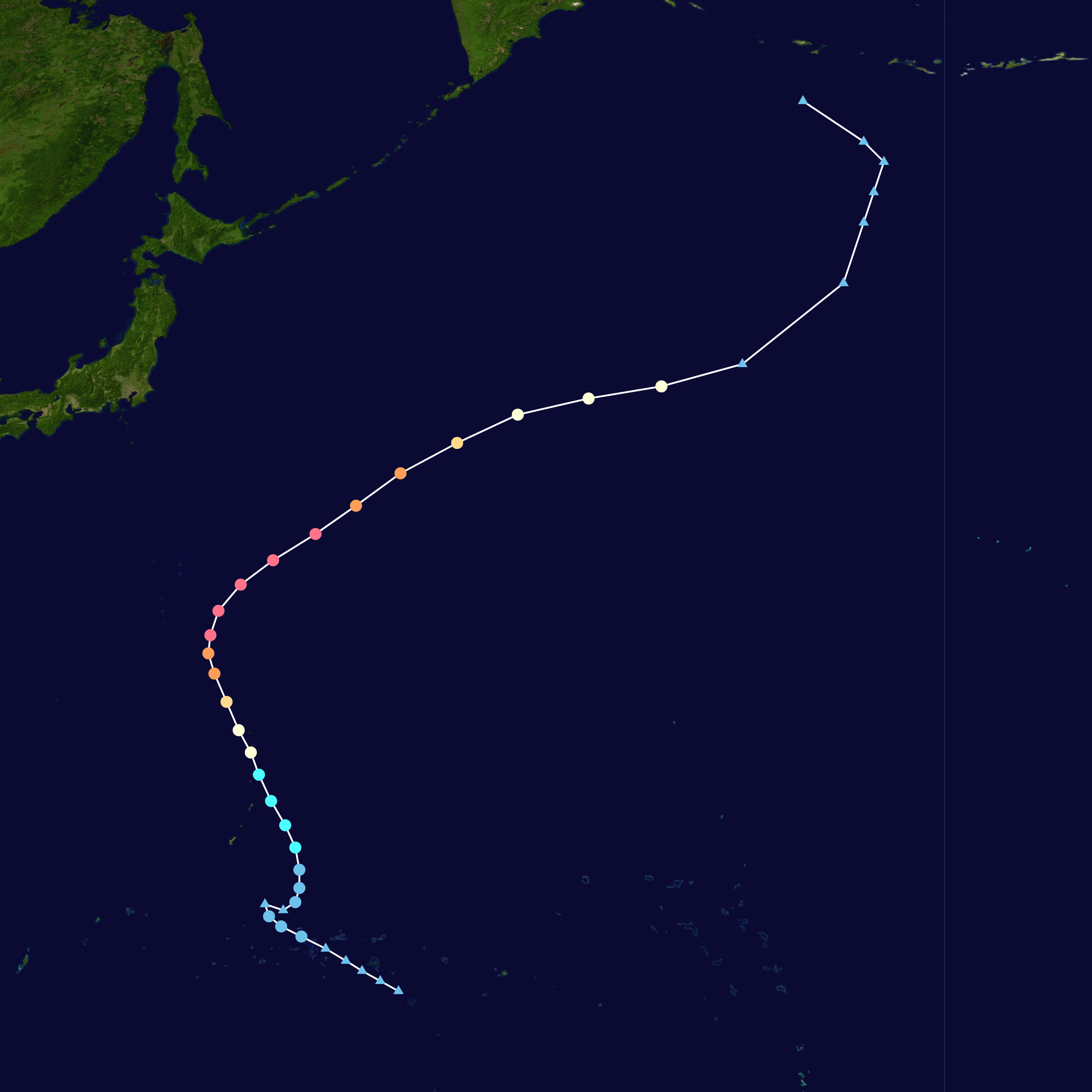
- Duration: October 18 – October 23
- Peak intensity: 165 km/h (105 mph) (10-min); 935 hPa (mbar)

Developing within the monsoon trough, convection increased near Truk on October 16. A central convective feature formed, and the system became Tropical Depression 23W that afternoon. Moving northwest, the depression weakened as it became sheared from the north. According to the JTWC, a new disturbance formed to the southeast of Guam, which would later intensify into Thad, however other agencies did not track 23W as a separate storm from Thad. Thad became a tropical storm as it approached Guam on October 19. Moving east of the island, Thad became an intense typhoon very early on October 22. Recurving into the Westerlies thereafter, the cyclone slowly weakened as it accelerated northeast and became an extratropical cyclone by October 24.

=== Typhoon Vanessa (Toyang) ===
- Violent typhoon (JMA)
- Category 5 super typhoon (SSHWS)
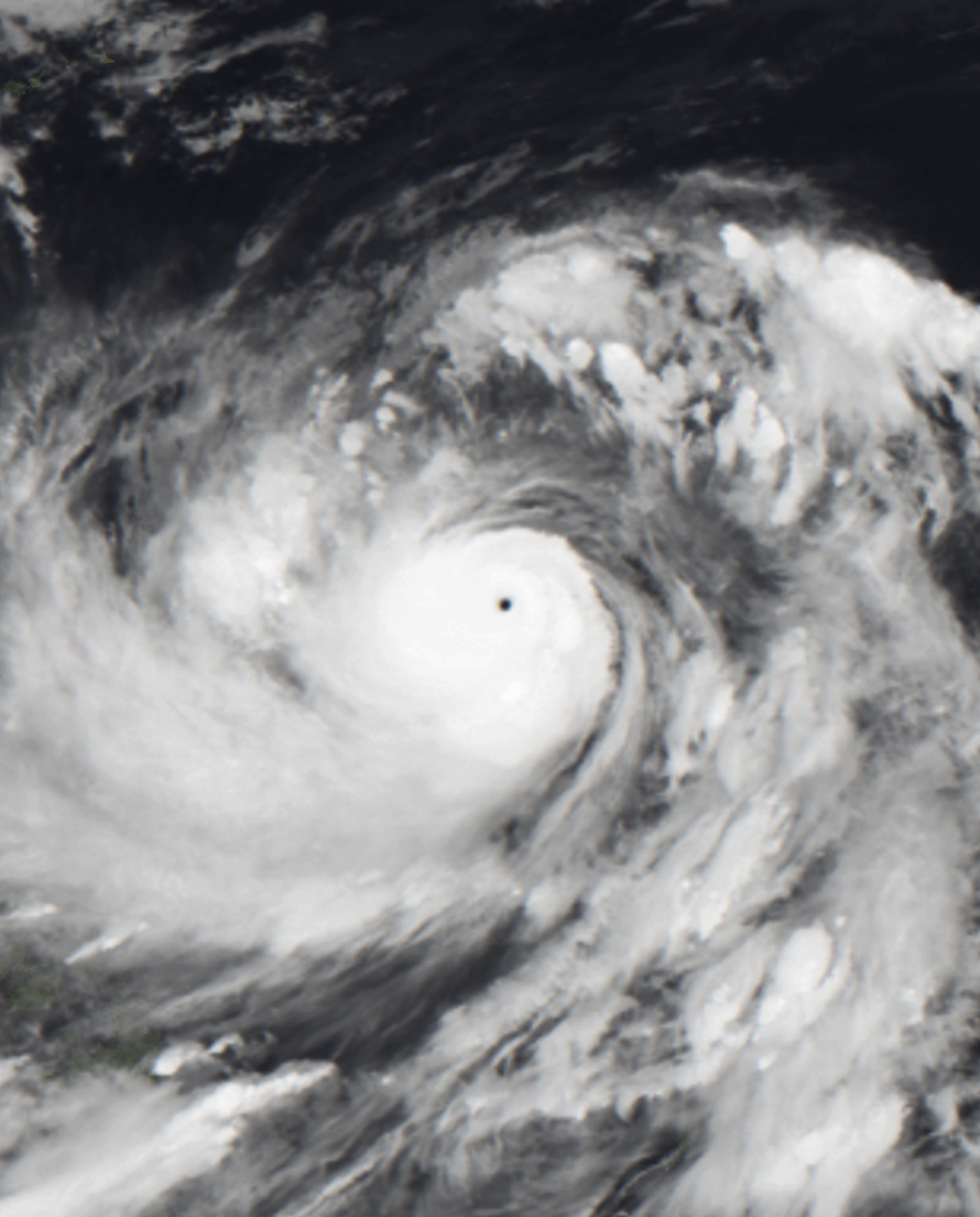
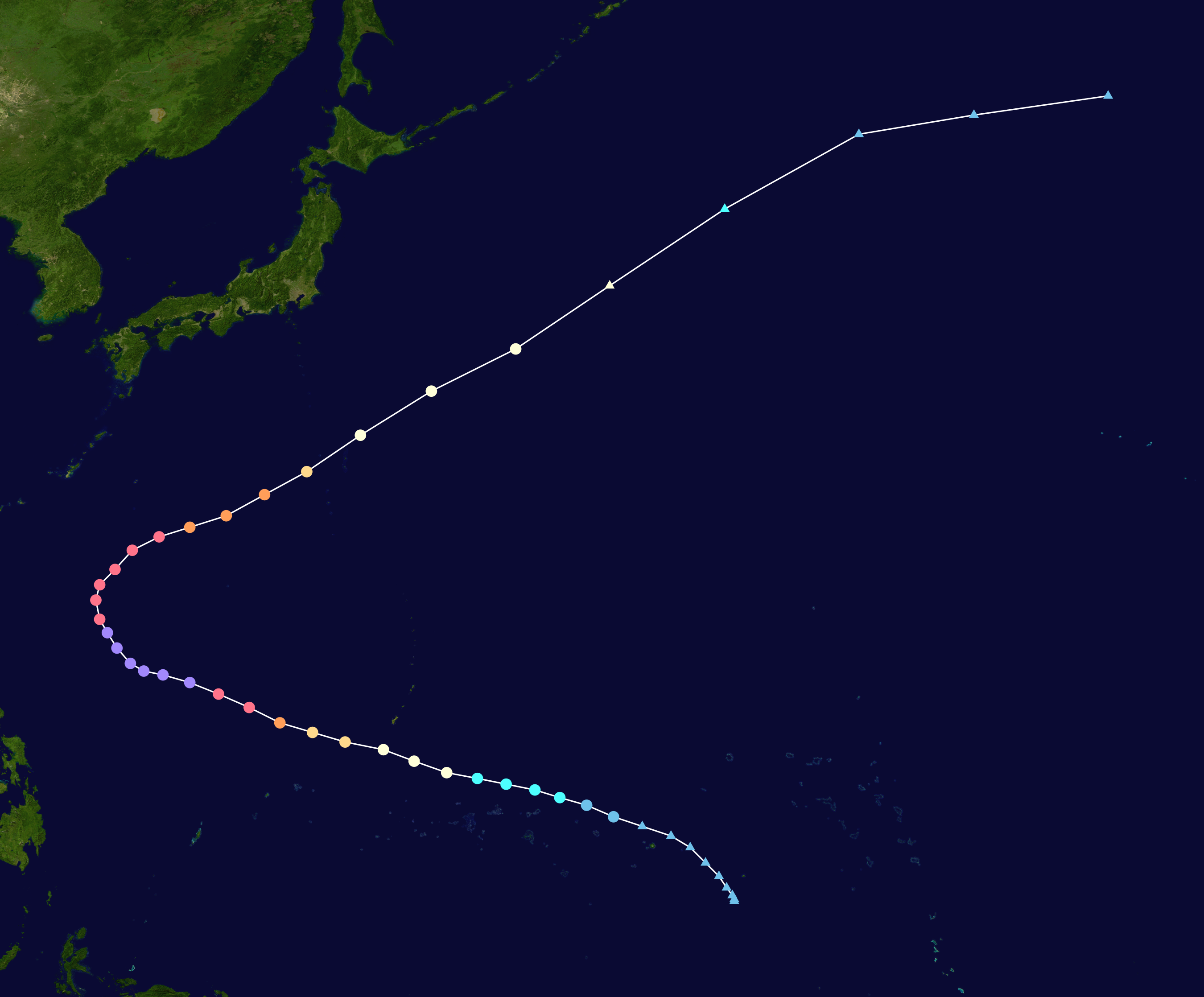
- Duration: October 22 – October 30
- Peak intensity: 220 km/h (140 mph) (10-min); 880 hPa (mbar)

This system formed in the near equatorial trough southeast of Ponape a few days after Thad on October 20. The system moved northwest to just north of Ponape as it slowly developed. The disturbance strengthened into a tropical depression by October 22 and a tropical storm October 23 despite some northwesterly shear from Thad. As a minimal typhoon, Vanessa moved about 165 kilometres (103 mi) south of Guam, where winds gusted to 59 knots (109 km/h) on Nimitz Hill. Damage on the island totaled US$1.7 million (1984 dollars), mainly to the banana crop. Moving west-northwest, Vanessa continued to strengthen, becoming a super typhoon. Super Typhoon Vanessa was the strongest typhoon of the season, reaching maximum sustained wind speeds of 180 miles per hour (290 km/h) over the open waters of the West Pacific. At its peak, it had a pressure of 880 mb, only 10 millibars higher than the record-setting Typhoon Tip of 1979. Its central pressure fell 100 mb in 48 hours. The intense cyclone recurved on October 27 and October 28 as a cold front approached from the northwest. Vanessa slowly merged with the frontal boundary, becoming a storm-force extratropical cyclone late on October 30.

Though the storm did not directly impact the Philippines, its outer bands triggered flooding that killed 63 people.

=== Severe Tropical Storm Warren (Reming) ===
- Severe tropical storm (JMA)
- Category 1 typhoon (SSHWS)
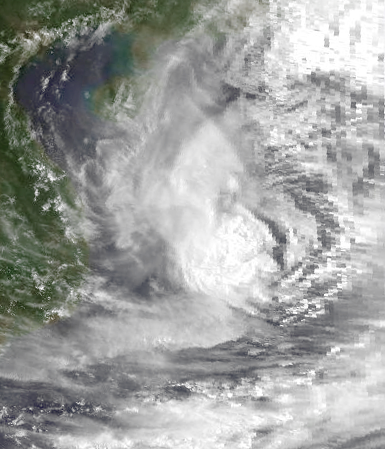
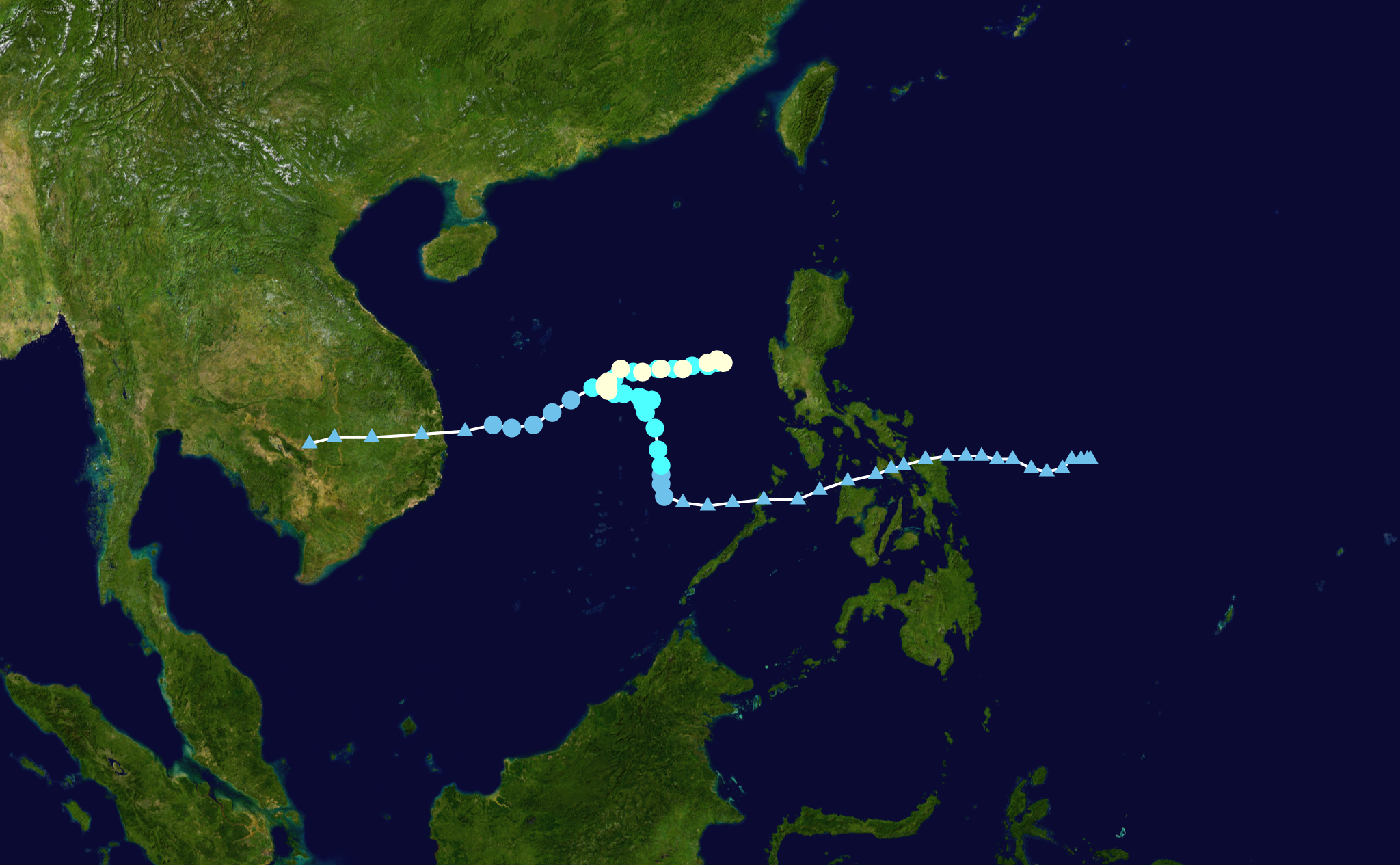
- Duration: October 23 – November 2
- Peak intensity: 110 km/h (70 mph) (10-min); 975 hPa (mbar)

The initial disturbance formed at the end of a shear line about 555 kilometres (345 mi) northeast of Mindanao. Embedded within the monsoon trough, it was a broad depression. It slowly weakened as it moved west-southwest through the Philippines into the South China Sea on October 22. Due to strengthening northeasterly low level flow, the circulation became better defined and conditions aloft favored strengthening. The system formed into a tropical depression late on October 23 despite easterly vertical wind shear. By early on October 24, Warren became a tropical storm which then turned to the north. Between October 24 and October 26, the cyclone performed a small cyclonic loop. On October 26, Warren strengthened into a typhoon.

The steering flow weakened around Warren at that time as Vanessa was moving to its northeast. Warren became entrained into Vanessa's southwestern circulation, and turned east-northeast. As Vanessa moved away from Warren, the cyclone performed an anticyclonic loop and turned back to the west on October 28. Clark Air Force Base recorded 222 millimetres (8.7 in) of rainfall on October 28 and October 29 due to Warren. The heavy rains over the Philippines led to landslides which killed 42 people. The passenger ferry MV Venus capsized on October 28, which led to an additional 36 deaths. The 930-ton ship Lorenzo Container VIII sank that day, which led to eight missing crew members.

Another surge in the low-level northeast flow to Warren's north led to an expansion of its wind field. This cooler and drier air was also weakening the cyclone. On October 30, the storm turned west-southwest and continued weakening. By October 31 Warren had weakened to a tropical depression and it dissipated as a tropical cyclone over water. Its remaining convection moved into central Vietnam on November 1. Its weakening center led to gales along the coast. By November 2, Warren's circulation center dissipated.

=== Tropical Depression Seniang ===
- Tropical depression (PAGASA)
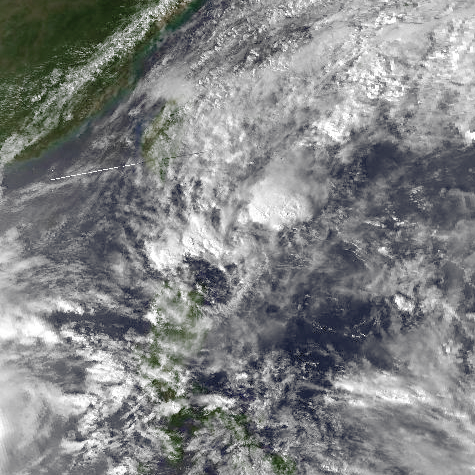
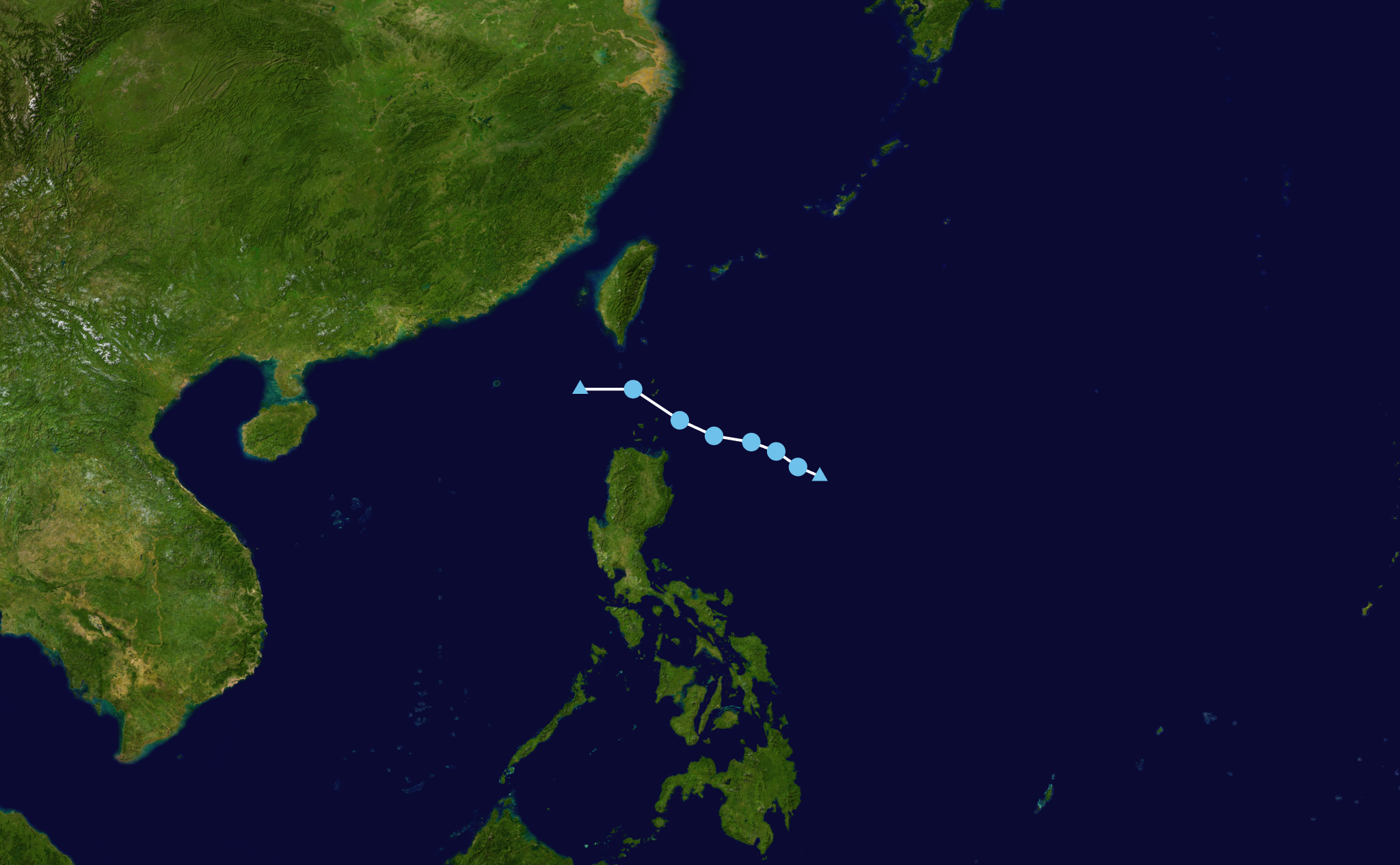
- Duration: October 25 – October 26
- Peak intensity: 55 km/h (35 mph) (10-min); 1005 hPa (mbar)

=== Typhoon Agnes (Undang) ===
- Violent typhoon (JMA)
- Category 4 typhoon (SSHWS)
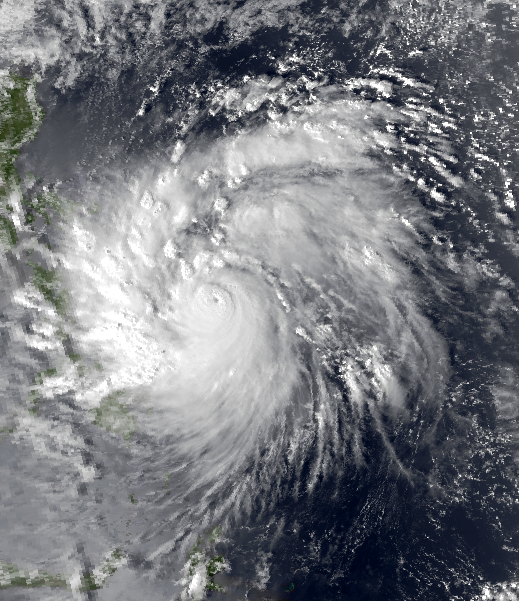
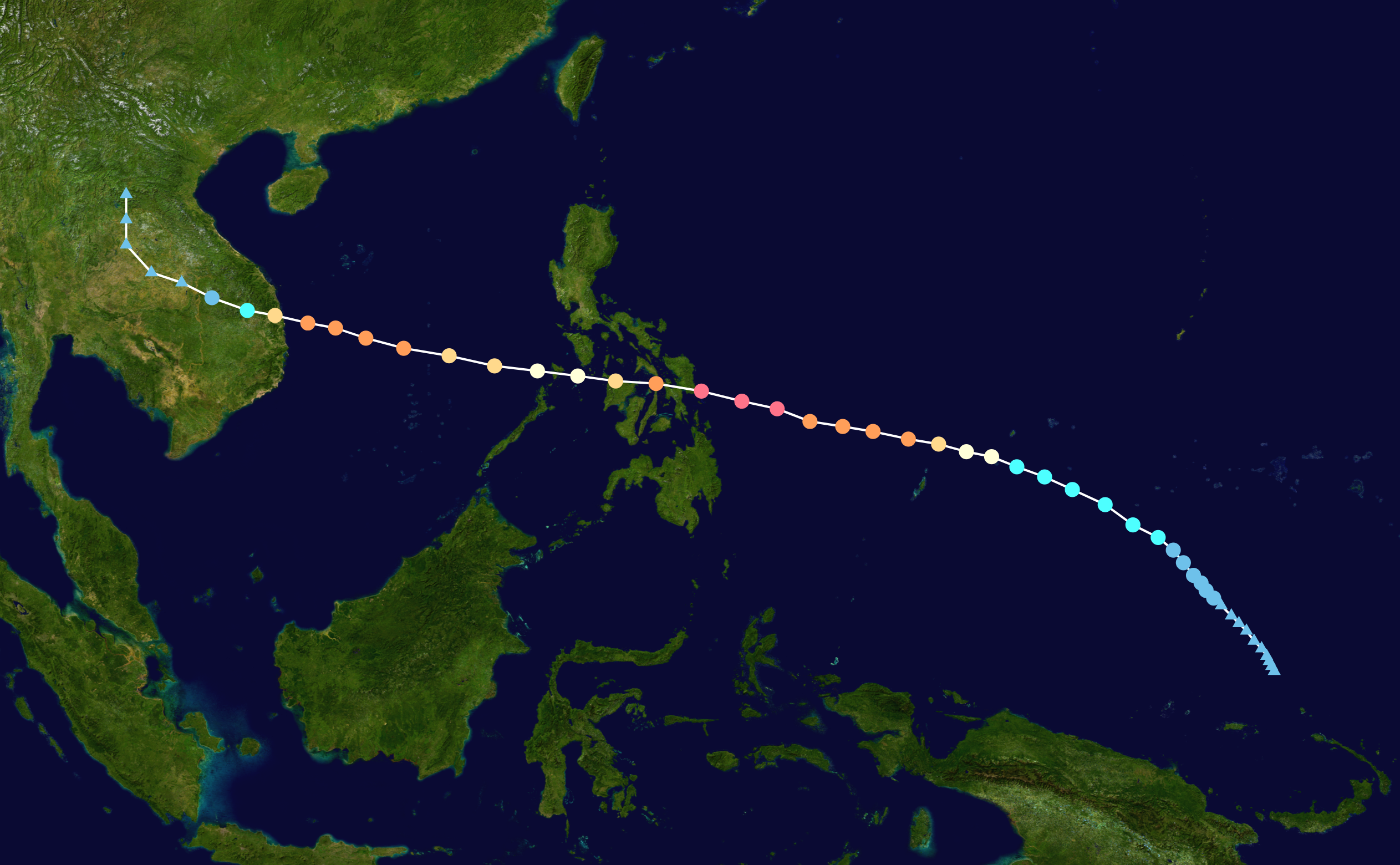
- Duration: October 31 – November 9
- Peak intensity: 195 km/h (120 mph) (10-min); 925 hPa (mbar)

This system began as an area of convection along the equator on October 28. Moving northwest, the system developed. On November 1, the system became a tropical depression and then strengthened into a tropical storm. The storm turned west-northwest due to a broad ridge to its north. Intensifying into a typhoon, Agnes became an intense typhoon as it approached the Philippines. Two months after Typhoon Ike hit the central Philippines, 140 miles per hour (230 km/h) Typhoon Agnes struck just south of Borongan on November 4. It crossed the islands and briefly weakened. Strengthening began as it moved through the South China Sea. It hit Quy Nhon, Vietnam as a 115 miles per hour (185 km/h) typhoon on November 7. Typhoon Agnes is considered the strongest in 55 years to hit Nghĩa Bình province [vi]. The lowest atmospheric pressure recorded in Quy Nhơn during the typhoon, adjusted to sea level was 984.0 hPa (29.06 inHg). Once onshore, Anges weakened rapidly before dissipating on November 8.

Across the Philippines, Agnes wrought catastrophic damage. A total of 201,014 homes were destroyed and another 163,506 were damaged, with losses amounting to 1.9 billion pesos (US$96.6 million). At least 895 people perished in the storm while 275 others were reported missing. Another 2,526 people were injured by the storm. Altogether, approximately 1.9 million people were affected by the typhoon. Extensive damage also took place in Vietnam where at least 134 people were killed. At least 30,000 homes were destroyed and another 120,000 were flooded or damaged.

=== Typhoon Bill (Welpring) ===
- Very strong typhoon (JMA)
- Category 4 super typhoon (SSHWS)
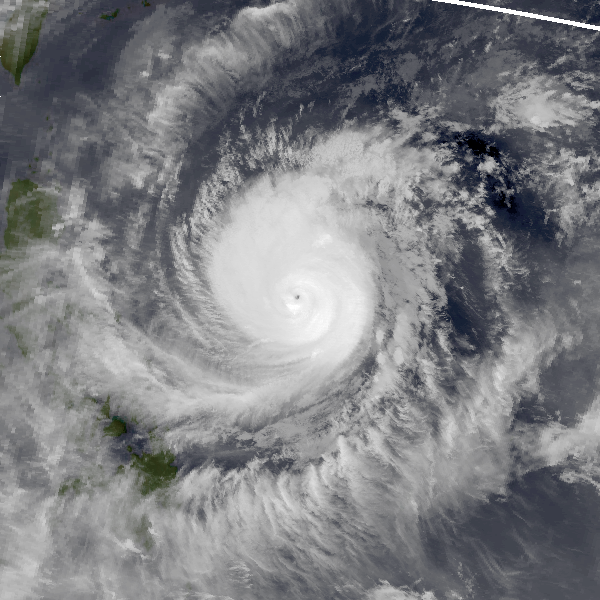
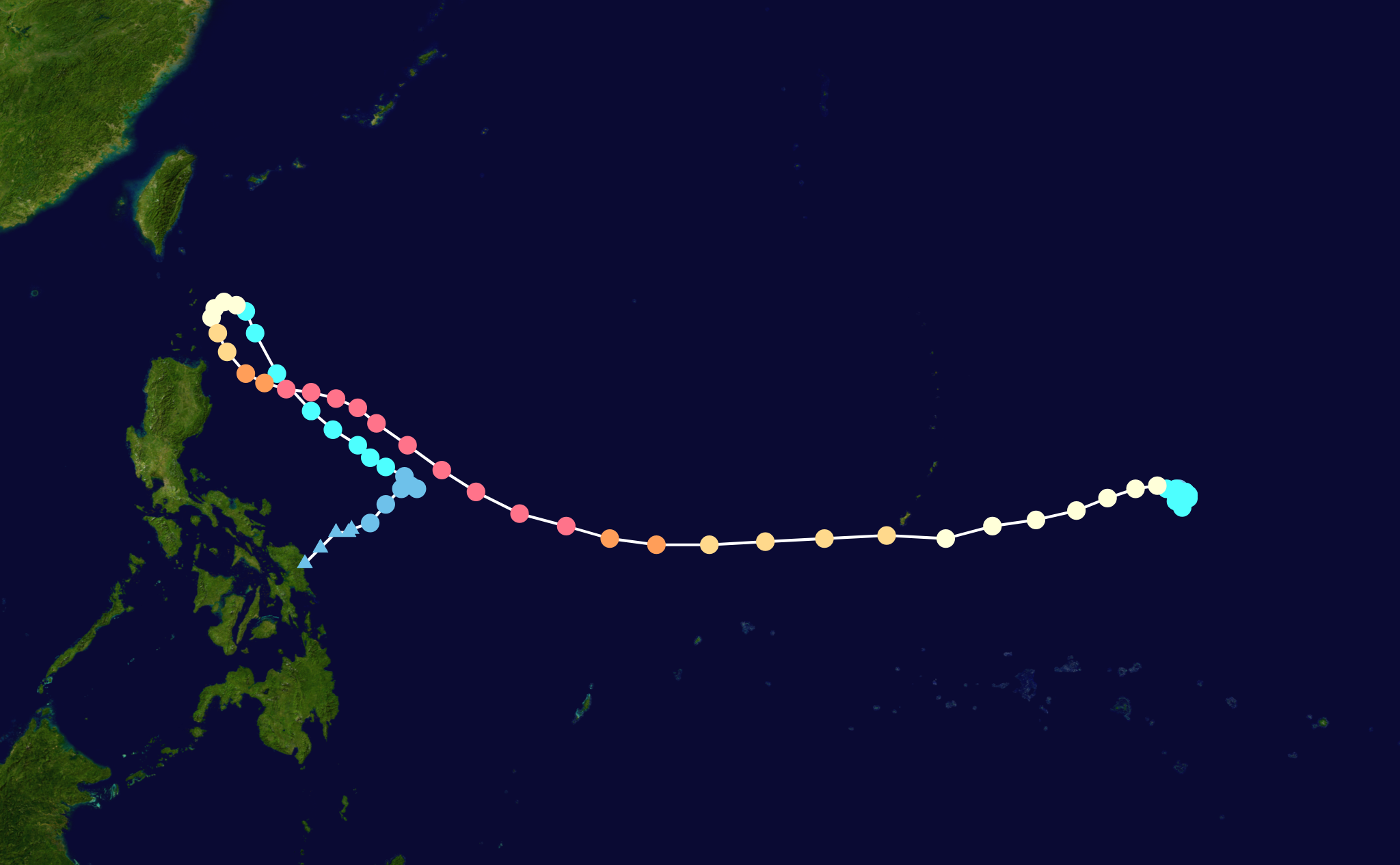
- Duration: November 8 – November 23
- Peak intensity: 185 km/h (115 mph) (10-min); 910 hPa (mbar)

An area of convection organized into a tropical depression on November 8 while east of Guam. It executed a small loop, reached tropical storm strength later on the 8th, and reached typhoon intensity on the 11th. Bill continued to strengthen as it tracked westward, reaching maximum sustained winds of 150 miles per hour (240 km/h) on the 14th. Strong upper-level winds weakened the storm, and as a break in the subtropical ridge brought the storm northward, upper-level winds from Typhoon Clara weakened Bill to a tropical storm on the 18th. It looped southeastward while just east of Luzon, and looped again to the southwest on the 20th. Bill dissipated as a tropical cyclone on the November 22, after causing minor damage on its path.

=== Typhoon Clara (Yoning) ===
- Very strong typhoon (JMA)
- Category 3 typhoon (SSHWS)
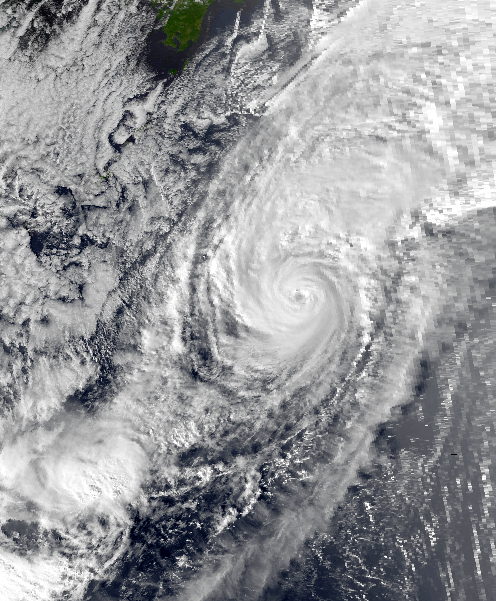
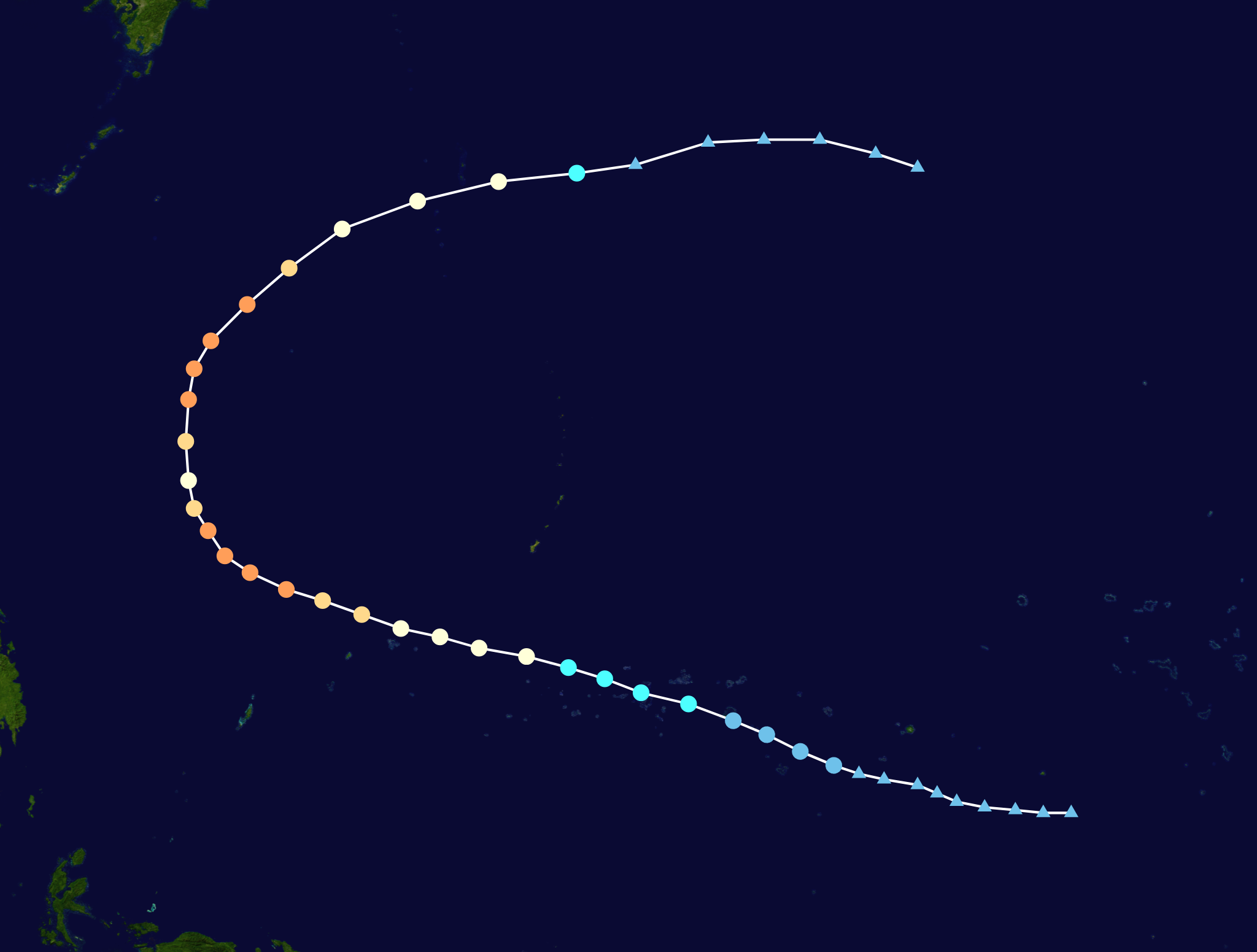
- Duration: November 14 – November 21
- Peak intensity: 165 km/h (105 mph) (10-min); 940 hPa (mbar)

A large, low-latitude disturbance formed in the eastern Caroline islands on November 11. By November 13, the surface low was gaining significant amounts of convection. Its circulation was aided by a tropical disturbance to its south in the Solomon Islands which enhanced westerly flow between the two systems, increasing the low level vorticity within the northern hemisphere system. Consolidation of the system began, and the system became a tropical depression on November 14. Further development of this system into a tropical storm and typhoon was accompanied by an expansion in the size of its circulation. As Clara recurved east of 132E, it passed within 930 kilometres (580 mi) of Bill, which radically changed Bill's course and weakened both cyclones. Once Bill moved farther away, Clara reintensified into a strong typhoon by November 20. Recurvature of Clara continued, and it became an extratropical cyclone along an approaching frontal zone, and was able to be followed through November 22. Iwo-Jima reported 40 knots (74 km/h) winds with gusts to 63 knots (117 km/h) as Clara passed by to the north.

=== Typhoon Doyle (Aring) ===
- Very strong typhoon (JMA)
- Category 4 super typhoon (SSHWS)
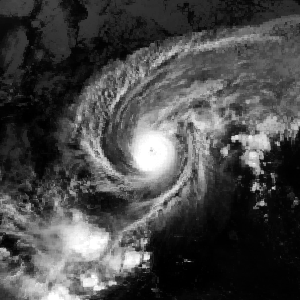
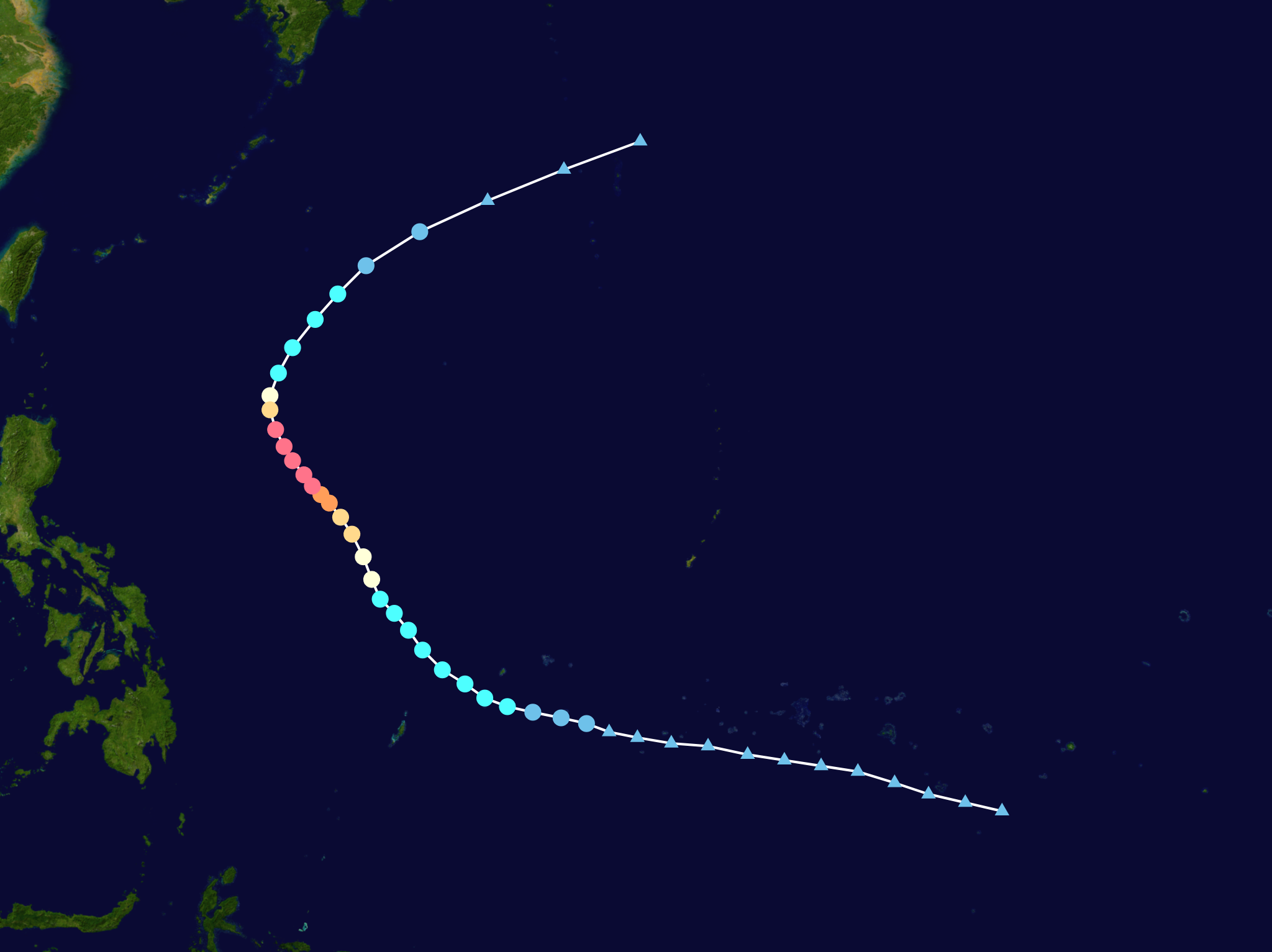
- Duration: December 3 – December 12
- Peak intensity: 185 km/h (115 mph) (10-min); 940 hPa (mbar)

Its initial tropical disturbance was first noted near 5N 156E on December 1. The system moved west-northwest, slowly developing. A low-level circulation in the Coral Sea helped enhance westerly flow to its south, which developed into a tropical depression late on December 4 and a tropical storm early on December 5. Intensification continued, and typhoon strength was reached late on December 6. Turning more northwest, the typhoon became intense early on December 8. As it recurved northward, the cyclone weakened quickly late on December 9 and early on December 10. The cyclone became an exposed circulation, and dissipated as a tropical cyclone over water late on December 11.

== Storm names ==
During the season 27 named tropical cyclones developed in the Western Pacific and were named by the Joint Typhoon Warning Center, when it was determined that they had become tropical storms. These names were contributed to a revised list which started on 1979.

Vernon	Wynne	Alex	Betty	Cary	Dinah	Ed	Freda	Gerald	Holly	Ike	June	Kelly	Lynn
Maury	Nina	Ogden	Phyllis	Roy	Susan	Thad	Vanessa	Warren	Agnes	Bill	Clara	Doyle	

=== Philippines ===
Asiang	Biring	Konsing	Ditang	Edeng
Gloring	Huaning	Isang	Lusing	Maring
Nitang	Osang	Paring	Reming	Seniang
Toyang	Undang	Welpring	Yoning	
Auxiliary list
				Aring
Basiang (unused)	Kayang (unused)	Dorang (unused)	Enang (unused)	Grasing (unused)

The Philippine Atmospheric, Geophysical and Astronomical Services Administration uses its own naming scheme for tropical cyclones in their area of responsibility. PAGASA assigns names to tropical depressions that form within their area of responsibility and any tropical cyclone that might move into their area of responsibility. Should the list of names for a given year prove to be insufficient, names are taken from an auxiliary list, the first 6 of which are published each year before the season starts. Names not retired from this list will be used again in the 1988 season. This is the same list used for the 1980 season. PAGASA uses its own naming scheme that starts in the Filipino alphabet, with names of Filipino female names ending with "ng" (A, B, K, D, etc.). Names that were not assigned/going to use are marked in gray.

=== Retirement ===
==== International ====
Due to a high death toll caused by Typhoon Ike, the name Ike was later retired and was replaced by Ian and was first used in the 1987 season.

==== Philippines ====
PAGASA retired the names Nitang and Undang, and was replaced with Ningning and Unsang for the 1988 season. The name Aring was also decommissioned from the auxiliary list and replaced with Apiang, possibly because of a storm with the same name that caused destruction in Luzon in 1980.

== Season effects ==
This is a table of all of the storms that have formed in the 1984 Pacific typhoon season. It includes their duration, names, affected areas, damages, and death totals. Deaths in parentheses are additional and indirect (an example of an indirect death would be a traffic accident), but were still related to that storm. Damage and deaths include totals while the storm was extratropical, a wave, or a low, and all of the damage figures are in 1984 USD. Names listed in parentheses were assigned by PAGASA.

Name	Dates	Peak intensity			Areas affected	Damage (USD)	Deaths	Ref(s).
Name	Dates	Category	Wind speed	Pressure	Areas affected	Damage (USD)	Deaths	Ref(s).
Vernon	June 7–11	Tropical storm	75 km/h (45 mph)	994 hPa (29.35 inHg)	Vietnam	None	None	
Wynne (Asiang)	June 18–27	Severe tropical storm	100 km/h (60 mph)	980 hPa (28.94 inHg)	Philippines, Taiwan, South China	None	3	
Alex (Biring)	July 1–4	Typhoon	150 km/h (95 mph)	960 hPa (28.35 inHg)	Philippines, Taiwan, East China, South Korea	None	None	
Betty (Konsing)	July 4–10	Severe tropical storm	95 km/h (60 mph)	985 hPa (29.09 inHg)	Philippines, South China	None	None	
Cary	July 6–17	Typhoon	150 km/h (95 mph)	955 hPa (28.20 inHg)	Mariana Islands	None	None	
Dinah	July 24 – August 1	Very strong typhoon	185 km/h (115 mph)	915 hPa (27.02 inHg)	None	$30,000	None	
Ed	July 24 – August 2	Typhoon	150 km/h (95 mph)	950 hPa (28.05 inHg)	Japan, Northeast China	None	1	
TD	July 30 – August 3	Tropical depression	Not specified	1,000 hPa (29.53 inHg)	Vietnam, South China	None	None	
TD	August 2–5	Tropical depression	Not specified	1,004 hPa (29.65 inHg)	South China	None	None	
TD	August 2–6	Tropical depression	Not specified	1,006 hPa (29.71 inHg)	None	None	None	
Freda (Ditang)	July 4–10	Severe tropical storm	95 km/h (60 mph)	985 hPa (29.09 inHg)	Philippines, Taiwan, China, Ryukyu Islands	None	2	
09W (Edeng)	August 11–14	Tropical depression	55 km/h (35 mph)	996 hPa (29.41 inHg)	Philippines, Taiwan	None	None	
TD	August 14–15	Tropical depression	Not specified	1,006 hPa (29.71 inHg)	None	None	None	
Gloring	August 14–17	Tropical depression	55 km/h (35 mph)	990 hPa (29.23 inHg)	None	None	None	
Gerald (Huaning)	August 15–22	Severe tropical storm	100 km/h (60 mph)	980 hPa (28.94 inHg)	South China	None	2	
Holly (Isang)	August 15–22	Typhoon	130 km/h (80 mph)	960 hPa (28.35 inHg)	Japan, Korean Peninsula	$1 million	19	
TD	August 17–20	Tropical depression	Not specified	1,004 hPa (29.65 inHg)	Mariana Islands, Japan	None	None	
12W (Lusing)	August 24–27	Tropical depression	55 km/h (35 mph)	998 hPa (29.47 inHg)	None	None	None	
Ike (Nitang)	August 26 – September 6	Very strong typhoon	165 km/h (105 mph)	950 hPa (28.05 inHg)	Caroline Islands, Philippines, South China	$230 million	1,474	
June (Maring)	August 26 – September 1	Typhoon	120 km/h (75 mph)	985 hPa (29.09 inHg)	Philippines, Taiwan, China	$24.2 million	121	
Moke	September 2–3	Tropical depression	Not specified	1,004 hPa (29.65 inHg)	None	None	None	
TD	September 10–16	Tropical depression	Not specified	1,002 hPa (29.59 inHg)	None	None	None	
Kelly	September 13–19	Typhoon	130 km/h (80 mph)	965 hPa (28.50 inHg)	None	None	None	
TD	September 22–24	Tropical depression	Not specified	1,004 hPa (29.65 inHg)	Mariana Islands	None	None	
Lynn	September 23–27	Tropical storm	85 km/h (55 mph)	998 hPa (29.47 inHg)	Vietnam	None	None	
Osang	September 25–29	Tropical depression	Not specified	1,000 hPa (29.53 inHg)	Caroline Islands	None	None	
Maury	September 26 – October 1	Severe tropical storm	95 km/h (60 mph)	990 hPa (29.23 inHg)	None	None	None	
Nina	September 27 – October 2	Tropical storm	85 km/h (55 mph)	992 hPa (29.29 inHg)	None	None	None	
TD	October 1–4	Tropical depression	Not specified	1,008 hPa (29.77 inHg)	None	None	None	
TD	October 3	Tropical depression	Not specified	1,008 hPa (29.77 inHg)	None	None	None	
Ogden	October 7–10	Typhoon	120 km/h (75 mph)	980 hPa (28.94 inHg)	None	None	None	
Phyllis	October 9–13	Typhoon	120 km/h (75 mph)	975 hPa (28.79 inHg)	None	None	None	
Roy	October 9–14	Tropical storm	75 km/h (45 mph)	996 hPa (29.41 inHg)	Mariana Islands	None	None	
Susan	October 10–15	Tropical storm	75 km/h (45 mph)	996 hPa (29.41 inHg)	Vietnam	None	33	
23W	October 17–18	Tropical depression	45 km/h (30 mph)	1,004 hPa (29.65 inHg)	Caroline Islands	None	None	
Paring	October 18–20	Tropical depression	55 km/h (35 mph)	998 hPa (29.47 inHg)	Philippines	None	None	
Thad	October 18–23	Very strong typhoon	165 km/h (105 mph)	935 hPa (27.61 inHg)	Caroline Islands, Mariana Islands	None	None	
Vanessa (Toyang)	October 22–30	Violent typhoon	220 km/h (135 mph)	880 hPa (25.99 inHg)	Caroline Islands, Mariana Islands, Philippines	$1.7 million	63	
Warren (Reming)	October 23 – November 2	Severe tropical storm	110 km/h (70 mph)	975 hPa (28.79 inHg)	Philippines, Vietnam	$239,000	73	
Seniang	October 25–27	Tropical depression	55 km/h (35 mph)	1,000 hPa (29.53 inHg)	Philippines, Taiwan	None	None	
Agnes (Undang)	October 31 – November 9	Violent typhoon	195 km/h (120 mph)	925 hPa (27.32 inHg)	Caroline Islands, Philippines, Vietnam, Cambodia	$90.7 million	1,029	
Bill (Welpring)	November 8–23	Very strong typhoon	185 km/h (115 mph)	910 hPa (26.87 inHg)	Caroline Islands, Mariana Islands, Philippines	None	None	
Clara (Yoning)	November 14–21	Very strong typhoon	165 km/h (105 mph)	940 hPa (27.76 inHg)	Caroline Islands	None	None	
Doyle (Aring)	December 3–12	Very strong typhoon	185 km/h (115 mph)	940 hPa (27.76 inHg)	Caroline Islands	None	None	
Season aggregates
44 systems	June 7 – December 12, 1984		220 km/h (135 mph)	880 hPa (25.99 inHg)		>$348 million	2,820	

== See also ==
- 1984 Pacific hurricane season
- 1984 Atlantic hurricane season
- 1984 North Indian Ocean cyclone season
- Australian cyclone seasons: 1983–84, 1984–85
- South Pacific cyclone seasons: 1983–84, 1984–85
- South-West Indian Ocean cyclone seasons: 1983–84, 1984–85
