= Typhoon Agnes (1984) =

Pacific typhoon in 1984

Typhoon Agnes (Undang)
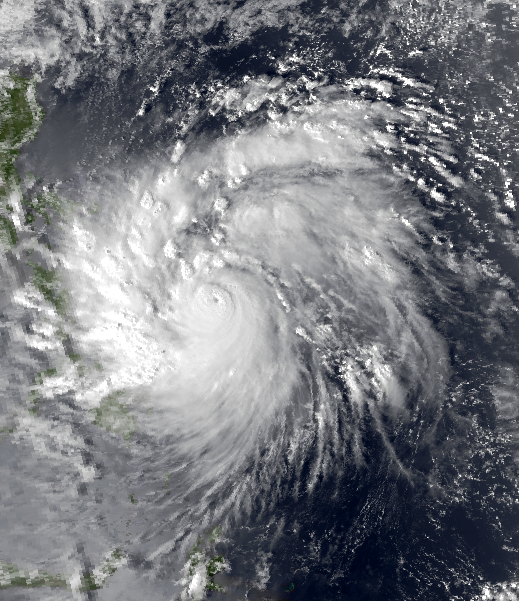
- Typhoon Agnes as a very strong typhoon on November 4

Meteorological history
- Formed: October 30, 1984
- Dissipated: November 9, 1984

Violent typhoon
- 10-minute sustained (JMA)
- Highest winds: 195 km/h (120 mph)
- Lowest pressure: 925 hPa (mbar); 27.32 inHg

Category 4-equivalent typhoon
- 1-minute sustained (SSHWS/JTWC)
- Highest winds: 220 km/h (140 mph)
- Lowest pressure: 925 hPa (mbar); 27.32 inHg

Overall effects
- Fatalities: 1,029 total
- Missing: 273
- Damage: $90.7 million (1984 USD)
- Areas affected: Philippines; Vietnam
- IBTrACS
- Part of the 1984 Pacific typhoon season

Typhoon Agnes, known in the Philippines as Typhoon Undang, was the fourth and final tropical cyclone to affect the Philippines during the 1984 Pacific typhoon season. An area of disturbed weather developed near the equator and the Caroline Islands on October 28. Following an increase in organization, the cyclone was designated a tropical storm on October 31. After tracking northwest initially, Agnes turned west-northwest the next day, a course that the system would maintain for the rest of its lifetime. Agnes intensified into a typhoon on November 2, and on November 4, attained peak intensity. The storm then made landfall on Samar Island, part of the Philippines, at that intensity. The storm weakened over land, but re-intensified over the South China Sea; Agnes obtained a secondary peak intensity on November 6. The next day, Typhoon Agnes moved ashore Vietnam while still at typhoon intensity. The storm rapidly deteriorated over land and dissipated by November 8 over Thailand.

Typhoon Agnes was the final of a series of tropical cyclones to affect the Philippines that season, following June, Ike, and Warren. Agnes brought widespread damage to several provinces across the central section of the archipelago. In the Iloilo province, 230 people were killed and four others were injured. Provincewide, a total of 21 homes were flattened, resulting in 1,326 homeless people. Damage in the province amounted to at least $5 million. Approximately 20% of the rice crop was destroyed in Iloilo. In the Capiz province, 265 people died and property damage amounted $25 million (1984 USD). Around 80% of houses in Roxas, located in Capiz, were damaged and 100 people were killed. Throughout Panay Island, four hundred forty-eight fatalities were reported, at least eight people were injured, five bridges were destroyed, and thirty-five schools were demolished. A total of 4,014 homes were destroyed; consequently, over 24,000 people lost their homes. Across the Philippines, 895 people died due to Agnes, with 272 people listed missing and 2,526 others wounded. A total of 491,968 people were evacuated to shelter in 27 provinces. More than 200,000 homes were destroyed while 163,056 other dwellings were damaged. Damage in the country totaled $90.7 million, with $19.1 million from crops and $56.9 million from public infrastructure.

In Vietnam, the typhoon severely affected the rice harvest and winter crop cultivation. The Bình Định Province suffered the brunt of the typhoon, where 134 people died and 289 sustained injuries. There, 400 schools and 230 nurseries were flattened. Throughout the country, the storm destroyed 271,000 hectares (670,000 acres) of farmland.

== Meteorological history ==
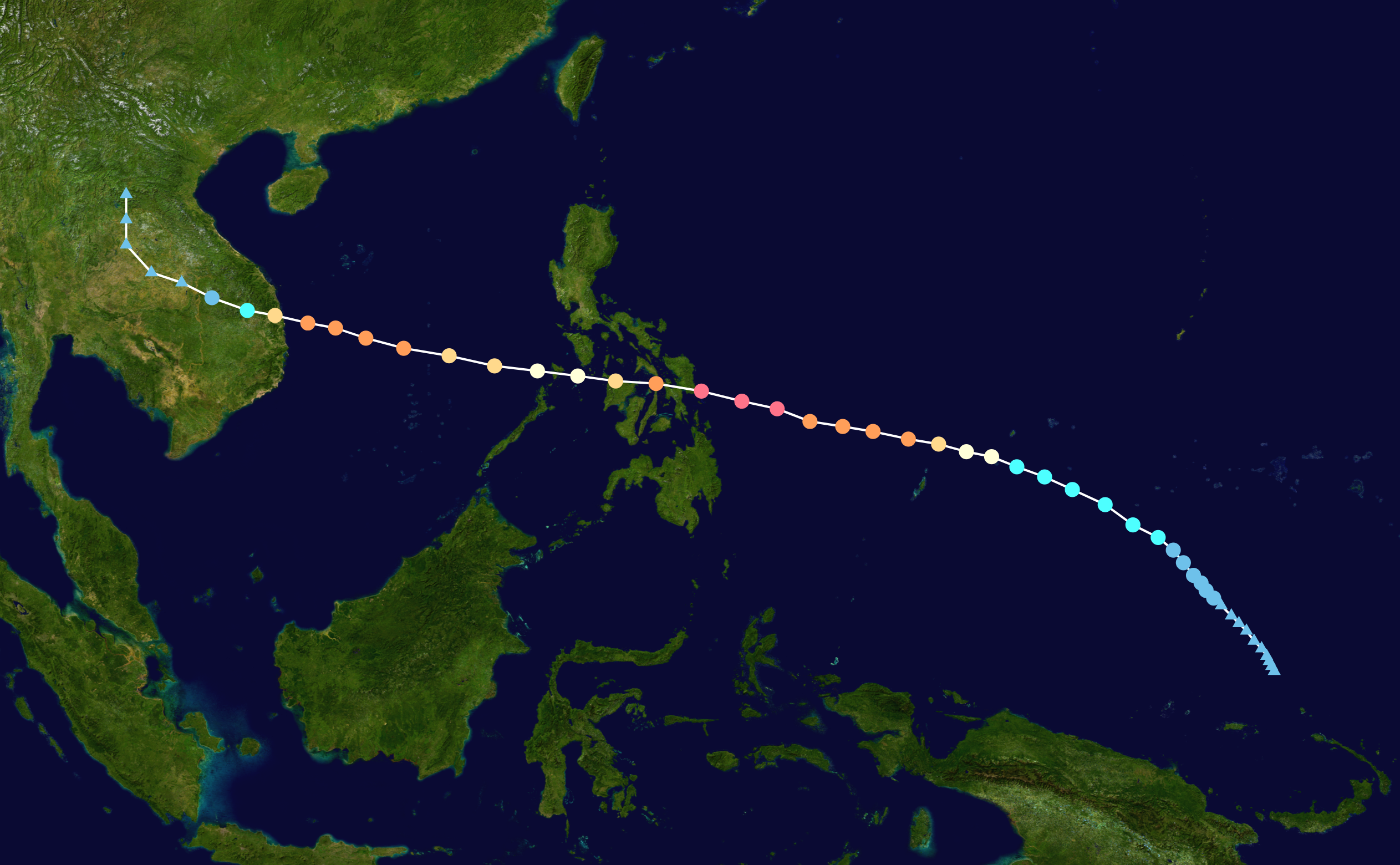
Map plotting the storm's track and intensity, according to the Saffir–Simpson scale Map key Saffir–Simpson scale Tropical depression (≤38 mph, ≤62 km/h) Tropical storm (39–73 mph, 63–118 km/h) Category 1 (74–95 mph, 119–153 km/h) Category 2 (96–110 mph, 154–177 km/h) Category 3 (111–129 mph, 178–208 km/h) Category 4 (130–156 mph, 209–251 km/h) Category 5 (≥157 mph, ≥252 km/h) Unknown Storm type Tropical cyclone Subtropical cyclone Extratropical cyclone, remnant low, tropical disturbance, or monsoon depression

Typhoon Agnes originated from an isolated area of convection located near the equator on October 28. Satellite imagery indicated a possible low pressure area near 149° E. Although the disturbance was not attached to the monsoon trough, an upper-level anticyclone became situated aloft, providing the system with strong ventilation. Midday on October 30, the Joint Typhoon Warning Center (JTWC) started tracking the system, with the Japan Meteorological Agency (JMA) upgrading the system to a tropical depression on the same day. (Note: The Japan Meteorological Agency is the official Regional Specialized Meteorological Center for the western Pacific Ocean.) Late on October 31, shower activity increased drastically in both coverage and organization as the disturbance tracked northwest. Early the next day, the JTWC issued a Tropical Cyclone Formation Alert. Shortly thereafter, a Hurricane Hunter aircraft investigated the system and found winds of 95 km/h (60 mph); these winds were significantly higher than intensity estimates from the Dvorak technique. At 06:00 UTC on November 1, the JTWC issued its first warning on the system, upgrading it to a tropical storm and naming it Agnes. The JMA also classified Agnes as a tropical storm at this time. (Note: Wind estimates from the JMA and most other basins throughout the world are sustained over 10 minutes, while estimates from the United States-based Joint Typhoon Warning Center are sustained over 1 minute. 10-minute winds are about 1.14 times the amount of 1-minute winds.)

Although Agnes initially continued to track northwest, passing through the Caroline Islands, by the evening of November 1, Agnes moved northward enough to feel the effects of a subtropical ridge anchored to its north, causing the storm to turn west-northwest. Despite its asymmetric structure, the JTWC classified Agnes as a typhoon midday on November 2. The storm began to rapidly intensify on November 3, with the JMA upping Agnes to a severe tropical storm at 00:00 UTC, and to a typhoon six hours later. Meanwhile, the JTWC elevated the intensity to 185 km/h (115 mph), which would make it a Category 3 hurricane on the United States–based Saffir-Simpson Hurricane Wind Scale (SSHWS). That afternoon, however, the typhoon began to level off in strength. Around this time, the Philippine Atmospheric, Geophysical and Astronomical Services Administration (PAGASA) also monitored the storm and assigned it with the local name Undang. After developing a small 10 km (6 mi) wide eye, at 18:00 UTC on November 4, the JTWC increased the winds to 225 km/h (140 mph), equal to Category 4 intensity on the SSHWS, its peak intensity. At the same time, the JMA estimated peak intensity of 195 km/h (120 mph) and a minimum barometric pressure of 925 mbar (27.3 inHg).

Shortly after attaining maximum intensity, the typhoon continued west-northwest and made landfall 10 km (6.2 mi) south of Borongan on Samar Island. Land interaction resulted in a weakening trend as it crossed the archipelago; however, due to its brisk forward motion, the JTWC reported that Agnes was still a typhoon when it emerged into the South China Sea, though the JMA estimated it weakened into a severe tropical storm over land. Over water, Agnes re-intensified, with the JMA designating it a typhoon again on the morning of November 6. Later that day, the agency estimated the storm attained its secondary peak intensity of 135 km/h (85 mph). Meanwhile, the JTWC estimated that the storm regained winds of 185 km/h (115 mph), an intensity that the storm would maintain until Agnes made its second landfall on November 7 40 km (25 mi) north of Qui Nhơn in Vietnam. Rapid weakening occurred over land, and at 00:00 UTC on November 8, the JTWC ceased following Agnes as it had tracked into Thailand. Thirty hours later, the JMA followed suit.

== Impact ==
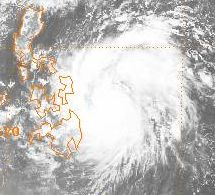
Typhoon Agnes just before its first landfall

=== Philippines ===
Philippine Airlines suspended all southbound flights from Manila during the storm's passage, but by November 5, all flights resumed except those to Tacloban, where the airport sustained severe damage. In the Iloilo province, several rivers overflowed their banks, resulting in 1.8 m (6 ft) deep water along streets. A total of two hundred thirty people were killed, including three from drownings, with four others injured. There, 21 homes were destroyed while 1,326 people were listed as homeless. Damage in the province was at least $5 million. Offshore, 32 fisherman were feared dead. Approximately 20% of the rice crop was destroyed, with the worst effects coming along the Jaro river. Nearby, in the town of Pilar, 38 people died. In the neighboring Aklan province, 24 people died.

Most of Roxas, population 100,000, was underwater due to the storm. Around 80% of houses there were damaged, 40–50% homes were destroyed, and 100 people were killed. Throughout the surrounding Capiz province, 265 people were killed and many towns were underwater. In that province and Illoilo, damage totaled $40 million, with property damage in just Capiz amounting to $25 million. Throughout Panay Island, 448 fatalities were reported and at least eight people were injured. Island-wide, the storm destroyed five bridges and thirty-five schools. It also wrecked dozens of fishing boats, and uprooted trees. There, 4,014 homes were demolished, resulting in more than 24,000 individuals losing their homes. Elsewhere, 41 people were killed in Leyte Island and Samar Island. In the former, two ships capsized that resulted in two drownings and property damage totaled $40 million. In the Antique province, authorities reported five deaths. In the Romblon province, five casualties occurred. On Cebu Island, six people died. Within the vicinity of the island nation, 38 children died aboard a ferry boat after it sank, though the adults on the boat swam to safety.

Nationwide, 895 people perished, with 272 people reported missing and 2,526 others hurt. Eighteen fishing boats sunk in offshore waters. Based on reports from the Philippines Welfare Ministry, 491,968 people were evacuated to shelter in 27 provinces, most of whom were homeless. In all, 201,014 homes were destroyed, which led to roughly 600,000 people losing their homes. Furthermore, 163,056 homes were damaged. Damage was estimated at $90.7 million, (Note: All Philippine currencies are converted to United States Dollars using Philippines Measuring worth with an exchange rate of the year 1984.) with $19.1 million from crops, $56.9 million from public infrastructure, and $14.8 million from private infrastructure. Agnes marked the final of several tropical cyclones to hit the nation that season, after June, Ike, and Warren. The United Press International noted it was the first time in living memory that Philippines was deluged with three catastrophic storms.

=== Vietnam ===
When Typhoon Agnes made landfall on Vietnam three days after it struck the Philippines, the typhoon dropped torrential rains that caused flooding, which severely affected the rice harvest and winter crop cultivation. The Bình Định Province was the worst affected by the typhoon, where 134 people were killed and 289 others were wounded. Some 400 schools and 230 nurseries were demolished. Nearly 200,000 ha (494,210 acres) of rice were flooded. A total of 6,315 ha (15,605 acres) of maize were damaged while 8,652 ha (21,380 acres) of sweet potatoes were flooded. Overall, the storm destroyed 271,000 ha (669,655 acres) of farmland. Over 600,000 people were directly affected by Agnes.

== Aftermath ==
=== Philippines ===
President Ferdinand Marcos declared a state of emergency for the provinces of Capiz, Iloilo, Aklan, Antique, Leyte, and eastern Samar. This area also covered the cities of Roxas and Tacloban. The Philippines Ministry of Health provided aid to 170,000 families. Immediately following Agnes, the Government of the Philippines dispatched a C-130 aircraft carrying relief supplies to the affected areas, including 40,000 lb (18,000 kg) of food and medicine to Roxas, where thousands of residents had gone days without eating. There, five helicopters were dispatched to rescue victims, many of whom climbed to rooftops for safety. The Philippines Navy sent a "floating hospital" to treat villagers in remote coastal areas. The Philippines Air Force provided 163 short tons (148 t) of food for 30,000 people, medicine and clothing.

In addition to national aid, various countries and human rights related organizations provided varying forms of assistance. The United States provided $25,000 in cash plus an additional $40,000 to help school re-construction and $540,000 to help re-build destroyed homes. Norway donated almost $80,000. The United Nations Development Programme awarded $30,000. UNICEF granted $50,000 worth of medicine. The Catholic Relief Services donated $65,000, with the intended use for shelter, food, and medicine. CARE also contributed $12,300 in order to repair a water tank and schools.

=== Vietnam ===
The Vietnamese government agreed to provide 20,000 short tons (18,145 t) of rice, although asked for foreign assistance to provide an additional 30,800 short tons (27,940 t) of rice. Australia alone added 1,000 short tons (905 t) of rice. The United States agreed to provide $150,000 worth of seeds, $45,000 worth of pesticides, and $25,000 in drugs. Bulgaria awarded $33,5000 worth of fabrics, medicines, and food. The Franco-Vietnam Friendship Association contributed a little more than $5,000 in cash. In addition, the League of Red Cross Societies provided 200 short tons (180 t) of milk powder and $112,360 in cash contributions. Oxfam provided nearly $57,000 in cash. The Polish Red Cross added around $2,200 worth of medicine. The Russian Red Cross Society contributed $275,862 worth of goods. The now-defunct Yugoslavia Red Cross granted more than $23,000 in cash. The Swedish Red Cross awarded over $5,000 in cash.

Within the United Nations system, the United Nations Development Programme provided $30,000 in cash. The World Food Programme gave 10,000 short tons (9,070 t) of cereal, worth $4.6 million. The World Health Organization provided three emergency health kits and 30,000 volunteers for a three-month period.

== See also ==
- Similar late season Central Philippine typhoons:
  - Typhoon Irma (1981)
  - Typhoon Mike – passed north of Mindanao and impacted the central Philippines, resulting in catastrophic damage
  - Typhoon Vamco
  - Typhoon Rai – A Category 5 super typhoon that also ravaged through the Caraga, the Visayas and also Cebu in December 2021
  - Typhoon Kalmaegi
- Typhoon Nelson (1982) – resulted in significant flooding across the Philippines after slowly traversing the archipelago
- Typhoon Haiyan
- Typhoon Ike – caused extensive damage and fatalities in the central Philippines before striking Vietnam
- Typhoon Rammasun
