= Typhoon Rai =

Pacific typhoon in 2021

Typhoon Rai (Odette)
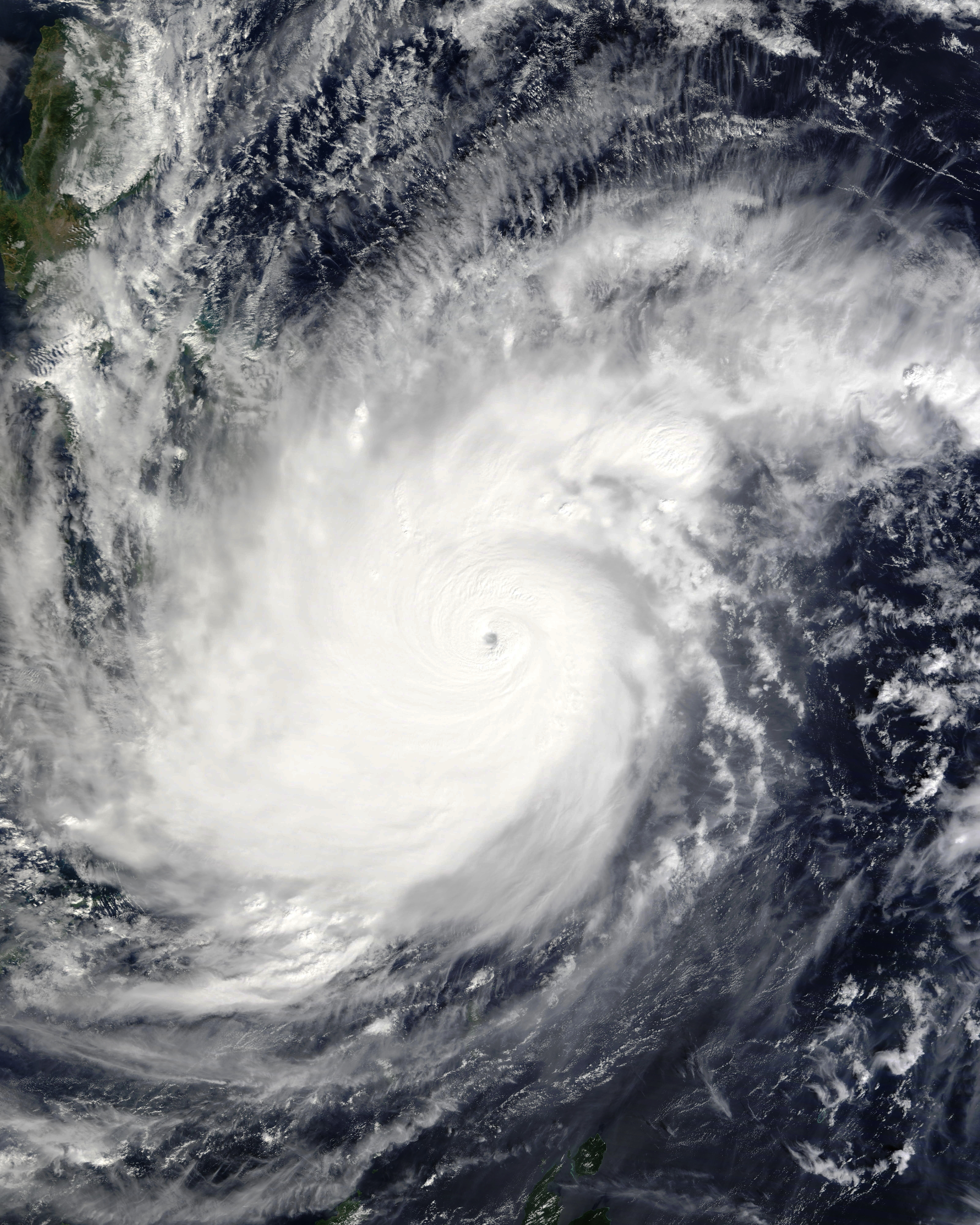
- Rai at peak intensity while approaching the Philippines on December 16

Meteorological history
- Formed: December 11, 2021
- Dissipated: December 21, 2021

Violent typhoon
- 10-minute sustained (JMA)
- Highest winds: 195 km/h (120 mph)
- Lowest pressure: 915 hPa (mbar); 27.02 inHg

Category 5-equivalent super typhoon
- 1-minute sustained (SSHWS/JTWC)
- Highest winds: 280 km/h (175 mph)
- Lowest pressure: 908 hPa (mbar); 26.81 inHg

Overall effects
- Fatalities: 410 total
- Injuries: 1,371
- Missing: 80
- Damage: $968 million (2021 USD) (Second-costliest in Philippine history)
- Areas affected: Philippines; Spratly Islands; Vietnam
- IBTrACS
- Part of the 2021 Pacific typhoon season

Typhoon Rai, (Note: The name Rai (Yapese: raay, [ɽ͡rɑːj]) was contributed by the Federated States of Micronesia and refers to rai stones, large donut-shaped stone relics used as ceremonial gifts, in Yapese.) locally named Odette, (Note: The Japan Meteorological Agency (JMA) assigns names to typhoons in the western Pacific Ocean and north of the equator, as the Regional Specialized Meteorological Centre. PAGASA assigns local names to tropical cyclones in the Philippine Area of Responsibility. On March 23, 2022, PAGASA revised their tropical cyclone scale and reclassified the system as Super Typhoon Odette.) was the second-costliest tropical cyclone in the Philippines after it struck the country in December 2021. The typhoon also killed 409 people in the Philippines, with the greatest deaths in Bohol province. Rai formed on December 11 in the western Pacific Ocean. Two days later, it strengthened into a tropical storm. After passing near Palau, Rai entered the Philippine Area of Responsibility (PAR) by the night of December 14, where PAGASA named it Odette. Rai attained typhoon status and rapidly intensified while approaching the Philippines. The American-based Joint Typhoon Warning Center (JTWC) designated Rai as a super typhoon. (Note: A super typhoon is an unofficial category used by the Joint Typhoon Warning Center (JTWC) (Note: The Joint Typhoon Warning Center is a joint United States Navy – United States Air Force task force that issues tropical cyclone warnings for the western Pacific Ocean and other regions.) for a typhoon with winds of at least 240 km/h (150 mph).) Around that time, the JMA estimated peak maximum sustained winds of 195 km/h (120 mph). On December 16, the typhoon traversed the Visayas in the central Philippines, exiting into the Sulu Sea. After making its last landfall over Palawan, Rai continued to weaken before unexpectedly re-intensifying into a Category 5-equivalent typhoon by December 18, while nearing Vietnam. On the next day, Rai entered yet another weakening phase, dissipating on December 21, southeast of Hong Kong.

As Rai pounded the Philippines, heavy rainfall and strong and gusty winds impacted several areas around the storm's path. Many areas across the Visayas and Mindanao lost electricity with several provinces and areas being deprived further of communication services. Downed trees obstructed many roadways, and flooding was a major problem across the affected regions, particularly Bohol, where the storm was described as "one of the worst for the province". Rivers also overflowed across Cagayan de Oro, while numerous buildings sustained damage. Surigao City was reported to be completely damaged, and appealed for aid. Bohol also pleaded for help from the government due to the damages Rai brought to the area. A state of calamity was placed in the province and Cebu. Damages were finalized at ₱47.6 billion (US$951 million), including ₱29.8 billion (US$596 million) of infrastructural damage. This made Rai the second-costliest typhoon in the Philippines, after Haiyan in 2013. Rai also affected Vietnam, where it killed one person.

As a result of the extensive damage and high death toll that brought in the Philippines, both names were retired following the season and they will never be used again in the Western Pacific basin and within the Philippine Area of Responsibility, respectively. They were replaced with Sarbul and Opong for future seasons.

== Meteorological history ==
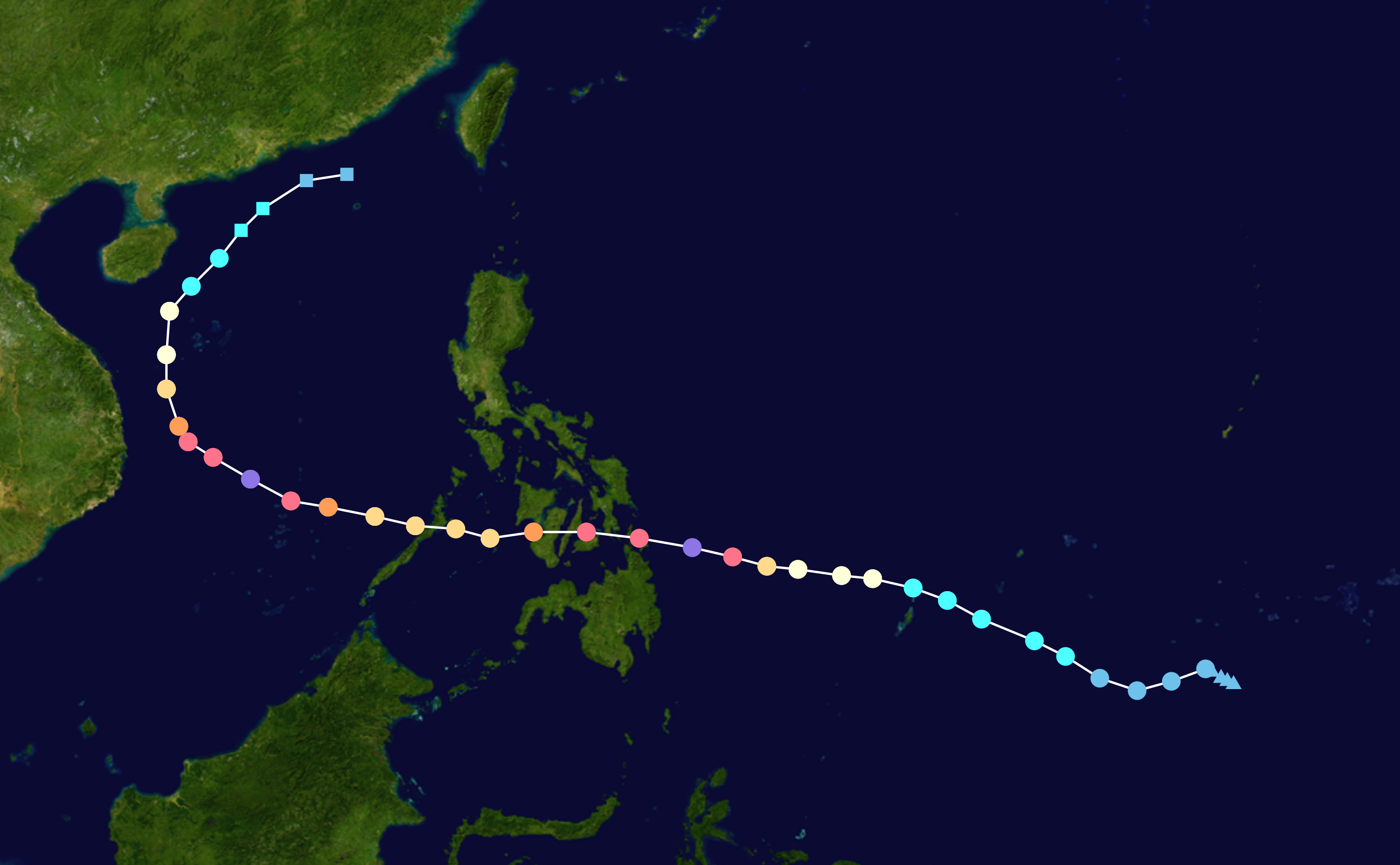
Map plotting the storm's track and intensity, according to the Saffir–Simpson scale Map key Saffir–Simpson scale Tropical depression (≤38 mph, ≤62 km/h) Tropical storm (39–73 mph, 63–118 km/h) Category 1 (74–95 mph, 119–153 km/h) Category 2 (96–110 mph, 154–177 km/h) Category 3 (111–129 mph, 178–208 km/h) Category 4 (130–156 mph, 209–251 km/h) Category 5 (≥157 mph, ≥252 km/h) Unknown Storm type Tropical cyclone Subtropical cyclone Extratropical cyclone, remnant low, tropical disturbance, or monsoon depression

At 06:00 UTC on December 9, the Joint Typhoon Warning Center (JTWC) started to monitor a low-latitude area of convection in the Pacific Ocean at 4.6°N 142.4°E, located about 650 km (400 mi) east-southeast of Palau. A broad circulation was identified by the agency, with flaring convection over it. The circulation had a marginal environment with low to moderate wind shear, fair outflow, and warm sea surface temperatures. Despite its given environment, however, the disturbance failed to intensify and dissipated by 06:00 UTC the next day. Another new area of low pressure formed on December 10, near the location of the previous disturbance. Analysis on the system revealed a degraded and disorganized low-level circulation center. Position fixes by 02:30 UTC on December 11 determined that its center had shifted to the north over a developing surface trough, while convective bursts occurred around the system. An advanced scatterometer pass featured below gale-force winds on its northwest quadrant. The Japan Meteorological Agency (JMA) (the official Regional Specialized Meteorological Center for the western Pacific Ocean) designated the system as a tropical depression around 18:00 UTC on December 11. PAGASA also started issuing warnings for the system, defining it as a tropical depression.

The storm was in a favorable environment with high sea surface temperatures and weak wind shear. It moved westward, steered by a subtropical ridge to the north. By 03:00 UTC on December 13, the JTWC designated the system as Tropical Depression 28W, highly based on Dvorak ratings of T1.5. Three hours later, the JMA upgraded the depression to a tropical storm, naming it Rai. Late on December 13, Rai began to pass south of Ngulu State, while continuing to intensify and organize. The JMA cited a good outflow and a favorable environment. By December 14 in the early morning, the system was upgraded to a severe tropical storm by the JMA. By 09:00 UTC, the JTWC noted that the system's cloud tops became warm; however, it further organized while tracking towards the small island country of Palau. The storm entered the Philippine Area of Responsibility around 11:00 UTC (19:00 PHT), and was named Odette by the PAGASA. Four hours later, Rai began to exhibit an eye which was first seen on microwave images. The JMA further upgraded the system to a typhoon by the next day, followed by the JTWC three hours later as Rai began to take a westward motion under the influence of a subtropical ridge to its north.

On December 15, Rai underwent rapid intensification as it approached the Philippines, developing a small eye within the center of the convection. Within the 24 hours before landfall, Rai surpassed meteorologists' expectations by increasing its wind speed by 85 mph (137 km/h). PAGASA forecaster Nikos Peñaranda stated that their models "weren't able to predict the way the storm intensified". This rapid intensification was regarded as a cause of global warming. At 00:00 UTC on December 16, the system attained the equivalent of category 5 strength on the Saffir-Simpson scale. The JTWC estimated peak 1 minute sustained winds of 280 km/h (175 mph). The JTWC classified Rai as a super typhoon but downgraded the system back to a typhoon three hours later. On December 16, the typhoon made landfall over Siargao Island in the province of Surigao del Norte around 1:30 PM local time (05:30 UTC), with winds of wind speeds of 195 km/h (121 mph). This made it the strongest landfall in December. Soon after its first landfall, Rai made a second landfall over Dinagat Islands around 3:10 PM local time (07:10 UTC). A third landfall occurred in Liloan, Southern Leyte at 3:40 PM local time (7:40 UTC). A fourth landfall occurred at Panaon Island, also at Liloan, at around 4:50 PM (8:50 UTC). Padre Burgos, Southern Leyte was the fifth at 5:40 PM (09:40 UTC), followed nearly one-hour later at President Carlos P. Garcia, Bohol and approximately another hour at Bien Unido, still at Bohol. The eighth landfall occurred at Carcar, Cebu by 10:00 PM (14:00 UTC) and the ninth over La Libertad, Negros Oriental, two hours later. The typhoon weakened while crossing the Visayas. As Rai entered Panay Gulf, its eye further weakened and its convective signature becoming disorganized as the JTWC further downgraded it to a Category 3 system six hours later. It continued to weaken while tracking towards the Sulu Sea by the next day at 03:00 UTC. By 07:10 UTC (15:10 PHT), the system made its final landfall over Roxas, Palawan as it continued to lose intensity.

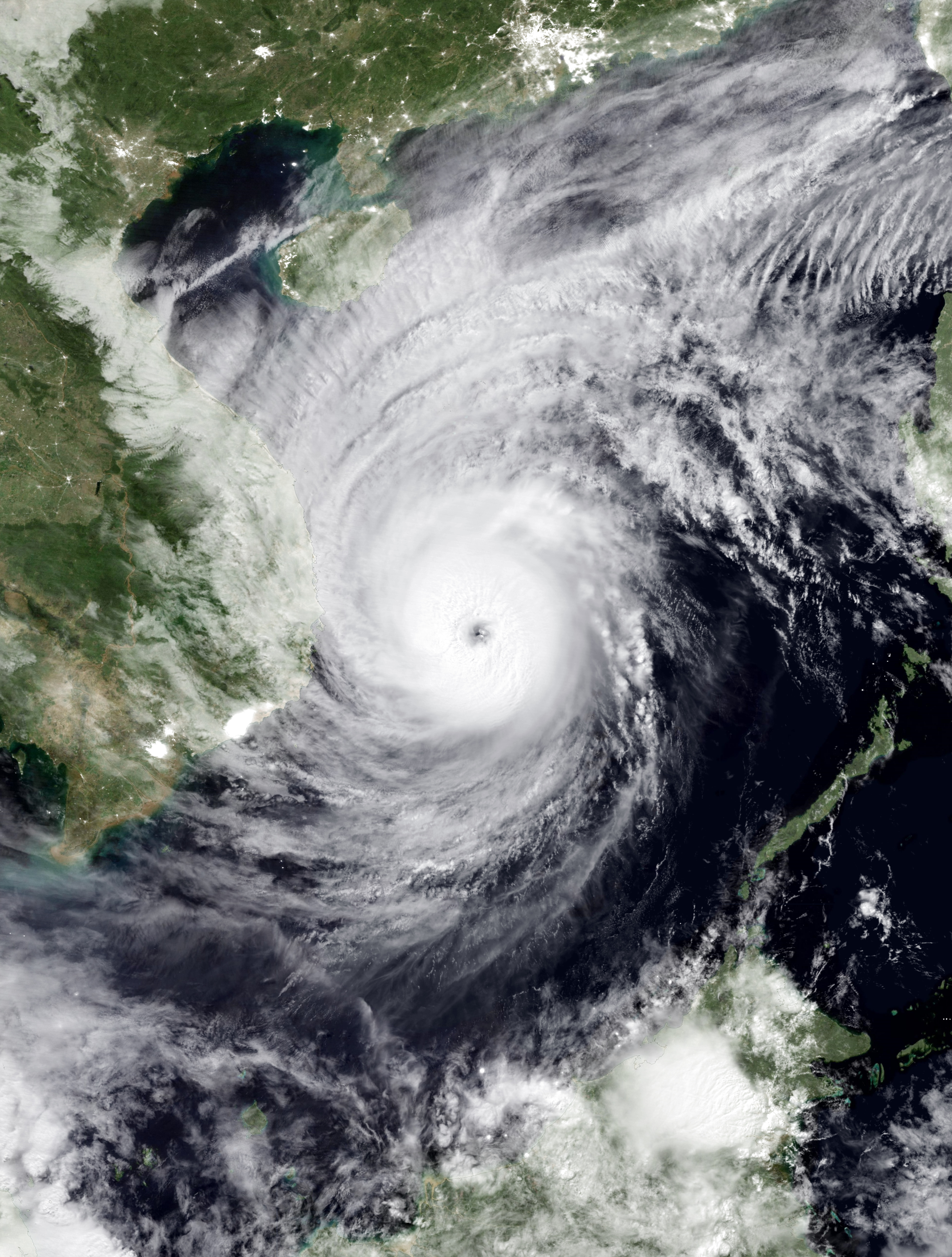
Typhoon Rai at its secondary peak intensity over the South China Sea on December 18

Rai then entered the South China Sea, where warm waters allowed for intensification. The system then left the PAR by 12:40 PHT (04:40 UTC). After a secondary period of rapid intensification, Rai attained Category 5-equivalent super typhoon status in the South China Sea on December 18. It was only the third time on record, after Typhoon Rammasun in 2014 and Pamela of 1954, to reach such an intensity in the South China Sea. However, cooler waters and dry air caused the typhoon to weaken again as it curved northwestward. On December 20, Rai weakened back into a tropical storm as the track shifted to the north, passing east of China's Hainan island. That day, the JTWC discontinued advisories, and on December 21, Rai dissipated off the southern coast of China.

On March 23, 2022, as PAGASA issued their revised tropical cyclone scale, Rai (Odette) was considered as a super typhoon.

== Preparations ==
=== Caroline Islands ===
Upon the system's intensification into a tropical depression, a typhoon watch was issued by the US National Weather Service in Tiyan, Guam, in Koror and Kayangel while a tropical storm warning was placed for Ngulu Atoll. The island of Yap was placed also under tropical storm watch. This was further upgraded into a typhoon warning for Palau as Rai further intensifies. The alerts for Ngulu and Yap were first canceled by 09:00 UTC of December 14 and six hours later, the typhoon warning were also canceled for Palau.

=== Philippines ===
==== Highest Tropical Cyclone Wind Signal ====
Highest Tropical Cyclone Wind Signal issued by PAGASA for Rai (Odette) in each province. The white line represents the best track.

PSWS	LUZON	VISAYAS	MINDANAO
TCWS #4	None	Bohol, Cebu, Siquijor, Negros Oriental, Southern Leyte	Dinagat Islands, Bucas Grande Island, Siargao Island, Surigao del Norte
TCWS #3	Northern Palawan	Antique, Capiz, Guimaras, Iloilo, Leyte, Negros Occidental	Cagayan de Oro, Misamis Oriental
TCWS #2	Mindoro, Puerto Princesa, Romblon, Masbate, Sorsogon	Aklan, Biliran, Samar	Agusan del Norte, Agusan del Sur, Bukidnon, Misamis Occidental, Surigao del Sur
TCWS #1	Albay, Batangas, Camarines Sur, Marinduque	Northern Samar, Eastern Samar	Zamboanga del Norte

PAGASA began issuing Tropical Cyclone Advisories as early as December 12 given the forecasted track of the storm. In its first advisory, PAGASA forecasted the possibility of Signal #4 being raised over the Visayas and Mindanao regions, later lowered to Signal #3. The PAGASA also forecasted winds of up to 155 km/h (96 mph) prior to landfall. On December 14, storm signals were raised in Caraga and Eastern Visayas as the storm entered the Philippine Area of Responsibility. Starting on the night of December 13, land travel on bound to Visayas, Mindanao, the province of Masbate and Catanduanes were canceled according to an approved request of the Office of the Civil Defense in the country. The Land Transportation Office also placed the same travel restrictions in Mindanao and Luzon as a precaution. All types of vessels are also prohibited to leave the country's ports if there are any storm signals raised. Fishermen living near coastal areas were also urged by the country's coast guard to leave their homes "as soon as possible". Other Philippine provinces like Bohol and Aklan were also prepared for possible work cancelations and evacuation premises in regards to the storm. Floating cottages in General Santos, as well as fishing boats were brought to shore and safety. The vaccination operations across the possible affected areas were earlier suspended by December 20–22. Over 23,642 food packs for evacuees were also readied by the country's Department of Social Welfare and Development (DSWD), over 18,665 non-edible items as well as over ₱752,250 (US$15,040) worth of standby funds. The airline carrier Cebu Pacific also suspended three flights in the country.

Over 12,000 individuals in barangays across Mindanao, Visayas, and further north into Southern Luzon were also urged by the National Disaster Risk Reduction and Management Council (NDRRMC) to immediately leave their homes. The whole of Bicol Region was also under red alert starting on December 14. The higher authorities there also warned its people of possible landslides and lahar flow from the Mayon Volcano. Cebu was also under a "state of preparedness" due to the storm. Furthermore, many individuals, of which the majority are going into the Bicol Region in the Parañaque Integrated Terminal Exchange (PITX) were also stranded due to ferry suspensions. Capiz already started voluntary evacuations at this time, first focused on people living in coastal areas. Liloan, Cebu also initiated forced evacuations by the afternoon of December 15. Several flights into Visayas and Mindanao from Ninoy Aquino International Airport were also delayed, rescheduled, and/or canceled, mainly from the earlier Cebu Pacific, Philippine Airlines and Airasia. Some face-to-face classes in the affected areas were also halted. Many billboards in Bohol were also removed and the annual Binirayan festival in Antique was canceled due to Rai. The city of Surigao was already soaked by the rains of Odette by the afternoon of December 15, including the whole of Eastern Visayas. Thousands of evacuees rushed into safety shelters in the area whereas in one case, they became full. Sandbags were also placed over some houses in Tacloban City in Leyte and many individuals rushed into a grocery store in Alangalang to stock up on essential supplies.

Four hours after, Rai entered the PAR, PAGASA started to hoist Tropical Cyclone Warning Signal #1 for southeastern Eastern Samar and over the Surigao provinces, including the Dinagat Islands. This was further extended into some provinces in the Central Visayas and further south of Mindanao, until Agusan del Sur. Signal #2 were further placed for the Surigao provinces and further into some parts of Visayas as Odette further intensified into a typhoon, with Signal #1 spreading further into the remaining part of the region and Mimaropa and Southern Tagalog provinces. The storm's further intensification led to PAGASA raising the Signal #3 warning in some portions of Caraga and as Rai underwent rapid intensification, into eastern Visayas before Signal #4 was raised in those areas.

On December 15, militants of the New People's Army attacked troops evacuating residents in Surigao del Sur prior to the storm, killing three civilians. On December 16, the PAGASA raised the signal in western Bohol, Dinagat Islands, and Surigao to Signal #4. 9,720 thousand were evacuated as Typhoon Rai made landfall. Following Rai's impact, around 332,000 people have been evacuated from their homes in total as of December 17.

=== Vietnam ===
As Rai approached Vietnam after clearing the Philippines, officials held a meeting in which more than 243,254 houses across eight Vietnamese provinces were identified as "unsafe", while rice crops were harvested by farmers in preparation for the storm. Vietnam Airlines' flight operations were also halted due to the typhoon, while marine equipment, particularly fishing boats, were moved onto shores as a precautionary measure. Lý Sơn Island also prepared to evacuate over 7,800 individuals. Towing vessels were also readied in case of marine emergencies over the South China Sea. Medicine and food packs were also prepared while houses over the areas that are foreseen to be affected by Rai were secured. 305,000 individuals were also readied to be evacuated from Quảng Bình to Bình Thuận. Heavy rainfall, strong winds and rough waves were also forecasted.

=== Macau and Hong Kong ===
In Macau, the Macao Meteorological and Geophysical Bureau (SMG) hoisted the typhoon warning signal number one in the early hours at 3AM on 20 December 2021 (MST). In Hong Kong, the Hong Kong Observatory issued the number 1 tropical cyclone signal at 11:20AM (HKT) on 20 December 2021, as Typhoon Rai approached the territory. Rai is the first typhoon on record to necessitate the issuance of typhoon warning signal in the territory in mid-December, on 20 December 2021, and the second on record in December. The last time such a signal warning was issued in Hong Kong in December was in 1974 as a response to Typhoon Irma. and was cancelled at 12:20PM HKT the following day.

=== Elsewhere ===
In China, Blue Typhoon warnings were issued in Hainan and Guangdong Provinces by the China Meteorological Administration.

== Impact ==
=== Philippines ===
Costliest Philippine typhoons
Rank	Storm	Season	Damage		Ref.
Rank	Storm	Season	PHP	USD	Ref.
1	Yolanda (Haiyan)	2013	₱95.5 billion	$2.98 billion	
2	Odette (Rai)	2021	₱51.7 billion	$968 million	
3	Glenda (Rammasun)	2014	₱38.6 billion	$771 million	
4	Pablo (Bopha)	2012	₱36.9 billion	$724 million	
5	Ompong (Mangkhut)	2018	₱33.9 billion	$627 million	
6	Pepeng (Parma)	2009	₱27.3 billion	$591 million	
7	Ulysses (Vamco)	2020	₱20.2 billion	$420 million	
8	Crising (Wipha)	2025	₱18.4 billion	$373 million	
9	Kristine (Trami)	2024	₱18.4 billion	$373 million	
10	Rolly (Goni)	2020	₱17.9 billion	$371 million	

Rai caused severe and widespread damage throughout the Southern Philippines, killing at least 409. The NDRRMC confirmed the damage in infrastructure to be ₱29.8 billion (US$596 million), along with ₱17.7 billion (US$354 million) of agricultural damage and ₱62.7 million (US$1.25 million) worth of damages to houses, with a combined total of ₱47.6 billion (US$951 million).

Over 100,000 people were moved to higher ground as flooding occurred. Strong winds and heavy rainfall also impacted Guiuan, Eastern Samar, with rough waves bashing the shores of the province, according to a news correspondent of 24 Oras. The same situation was also felt across the entirety of Western Visayas. As Rai impacted Liloan in Southern Leyte, an area there was described as "cut-off", indicating that there was no electricity or means of communications in the place. A GMA News reporter recalling his experience inside the storm reported that the building where his team was sustained considerable damage, comparing it to Typhoon Haiyan in terms of ferocity. Their vehicles also received damage from the storm. After the storm passed over the area, the whole municipality was reported to be isolated. Many provinces in Mindanao also were severely affected by the typhoon. In Cagayan de Oro, despite rushing water, rescue teams continued to save many people in their houses from the floods. A house was heavily destroyed by Odette's strong winds in Agusan del Norte while a barge of unknown origins was left stranded by the storm's waves on a shore, still in the province. Storm surge also impacted the coast boulevards of Surigao del Norte while Iligan's Mandulog River overflowed. The incident was a horror to many residents there, due to the same effect Tropical Storm Washi in 2011 brought. Further south, it also caused rough waves over Cateel. The Cagayan de Oro River also overflowed, causing several homes to be near-completely inundated. The first fatality from the storm was reported at Iloilo, where a woman was crushed to death in her house by a bamboo tree.

Satellite animation of Typhoon Rai making landfall in General Luna, Surigao del Norte in the Philippines on December 16

The first responders themselves are victims. So this is Typhoon Haiyan [Yolanda] again. (Note: Filipino: "Yung first responders mismo, biktima kaming lahat. So this is Typhoon Haiyan [Yolanda] again.")

— Bohol governor Arthur C. Yap, GMA News, December 17, 2021

Surigao City was deprived of electricity and communications due to downed power lines while scores of trees left many roads impassable. Many buildings in the area were also devastated and the overall impact of Rai in the area were described as "widespread". Clean water supply became a problem in the city while almost all coastal houses were destroyed by the typhoon's storm surge. The main wet market of the area was also closed, still due to the effects of the system. Authorities are verifying a possible second death due to Rai in the city and a third elsewhere in southern Mindanao. The mayor of Surigao City, Ernesto Matugas also estimated that 100% of the area was devastated due to Odette, also appealing for aid to the government. Aid was also requested by the province of Bohol, where a chief of the area's Provincial Disaster Risk Reduction and Management Office (PDRRMO) described Rai as "one of the worst ever for the province". Many areas in the island were severely inundated, including Loboc, among the worst hit. The whole province also lost power services. The governor of the province, Arthur Yap estimated the damages at ₱5 billion ($100 million). A terminal in Siargao Airport was also totally destroyed; the overall island was also wrecked according to the first district representative of Surigao del Norte, Francisco Jose Matugas II. Southern Surigao confirmed a death, while two people died in Bukidnon. Three individuals were killed due to various reasons across Negros Occidental. Numerous houses there were also destroyed by downed trees, with a triage of the Ignacio Locsin Arroyo Memorial District Hospital being wrecked. Some areas in Kabankalan were also inundated due to a river overflowing there. The Philippine National Police (PNP) also listed two people to be unaccounted for from Western Visayas.

Typhoon Rai's casualties in provinces of the Philippines
Provinces	Deaths	Ref.
Bohol	111
Cebu	96
Negros Oriental	74
Negros Occidental	45
Southern Leyte	28
Palawan	22
Surigao del Norte	18
Dinagat Islands	14
Leyte	1
Total	409

Further assessments of the NDRRMC reported at least 12 killed due to the typhoon across the affected areas, while seven people were missing. A briefing with the Philippine President Rodrigo Duterte occurred on the night of December 17, where the agency noted that many provinces were also pleading for help, especially Cebu. The governor of Surigao also observed that over 99 percent of individuals of Surigao were affected. Aerial operations were also conducted by the Philippine Coast Guard, where they saw the total devastation of the island. The area were also reported to have been isolated from any means of transportations except for air. The government there also estimated damages to be ₱20 billion ($400 million). The Dinagat Islands were also wrecked due to Rai, with their governor Arlene Bag-ao also requesting aid from the government, and saying the islands was "levelled to the ground". 95 percent of houses were estimated to have lost their roofs, and emergency shelters were destroyed. Almost all of Visayas have been left without electricity, according to the Department of Energy (DOE). In Negros Occidental, the agricultural damage is estimated at ₱4.45 billion ($89 million), and it rose up to ₱5.41 billion ($108 million) from the Department of Agriculture and Department of Public Works and Highways.

At least 332,000 people were evacuated from their homes. The storm affected areas that were still rebuilding from storms late last year. At least 140,000 people were severely affected, with the United Nations estimating 13 million were affected in some way. Military-released aerial photos showed General Luna was destroyed by the typhoon. As the ravaged areas were examined, the death toll rose to 75, the majority of which were from Bohol. 12 were further reported by December 19, making the casualty toll at 87 as of that day. A landslide also caused the deaths of five people and left six missing, out of 11, further raising the toll to 92. The Associated Press, however indicated that over 112 were killed during the storm. 78 marine vessels in Cebu also experienced sea mishaps, according to the PCG, while over 4,000 houses in Southern Leyte were destroyed due to the storm-induced storm surge. In northern Palawan, where Rai made its last landfall before clearing the country, many houses were downed and trees obstructed several roadways. Many locations in the province, including the major city Puerto Princesa were left without electricity, water supply and communication signals. 630,000 people were displaced, 438,000 were in 2,841 evacuation centers. At least 41 areas were flooded, 227 municipalities experienced power outages, and 135 saw telecommunication issues. Three days after the storm, 9% were estimated to have their outages fixed, and 70% communication restored. 139,000 houses were damaged, with 54,000 being totally damaged and 82,000 partially.

On Pag-asa Island of the Spratly Islands, some residential houses, schools, and government facilities including the new coast guard station were severely damaged by the typhoon.

Animated enhanced infrared satellite loop of Typhoon Rai from peak intensity to making landfall in the Philippines

=== Vietnam ===
Rai wreaked havoc across Vietnamese-held isles in the Spratly Islands. An observation tower in Southwest Cay recorded sustained winds up to 164 km/h (102 mph) and a gust of 204 km/h (127 mph) during the afternoon of December 18 before being knocked down. The storm destroyed 500 square meters (5,400 sq ft) of civilian house tiles, 27 solar batteries, 400 square meters (4,300 sq ft) of farmland, and knocked down 90% of the trees on the island; no casualties were reported there. Rai began to batter the Central Vietnamese coast at night, with winds in several provinces averaging 65–90 km/h (40–56 mph). Heavy rainfall was unleashed on Thừa Thiên – Huế to Khánh Hòa, with reports showing an average of 100–200 mm (3.9–7.9 in) of rainfall; some places recorded up to 300 mm (12 in) of rain. In Nghệ An province, two crew members of a fishing vessel were reported missing in the waters off Bạch Long Vĩ Island.

On December 19, one person (fisherman) was reported dead in Tuy Phong, five ships were capsized and three others were damaged off the coast of Bình Thuận. Rough storm waves damaged and destroyed 90 lobster herds on Bình Hưng Island, Cam Ranh, where losses was estimated to be more than 384 billion đồng (US$16.7 million).

== Aftermath ==
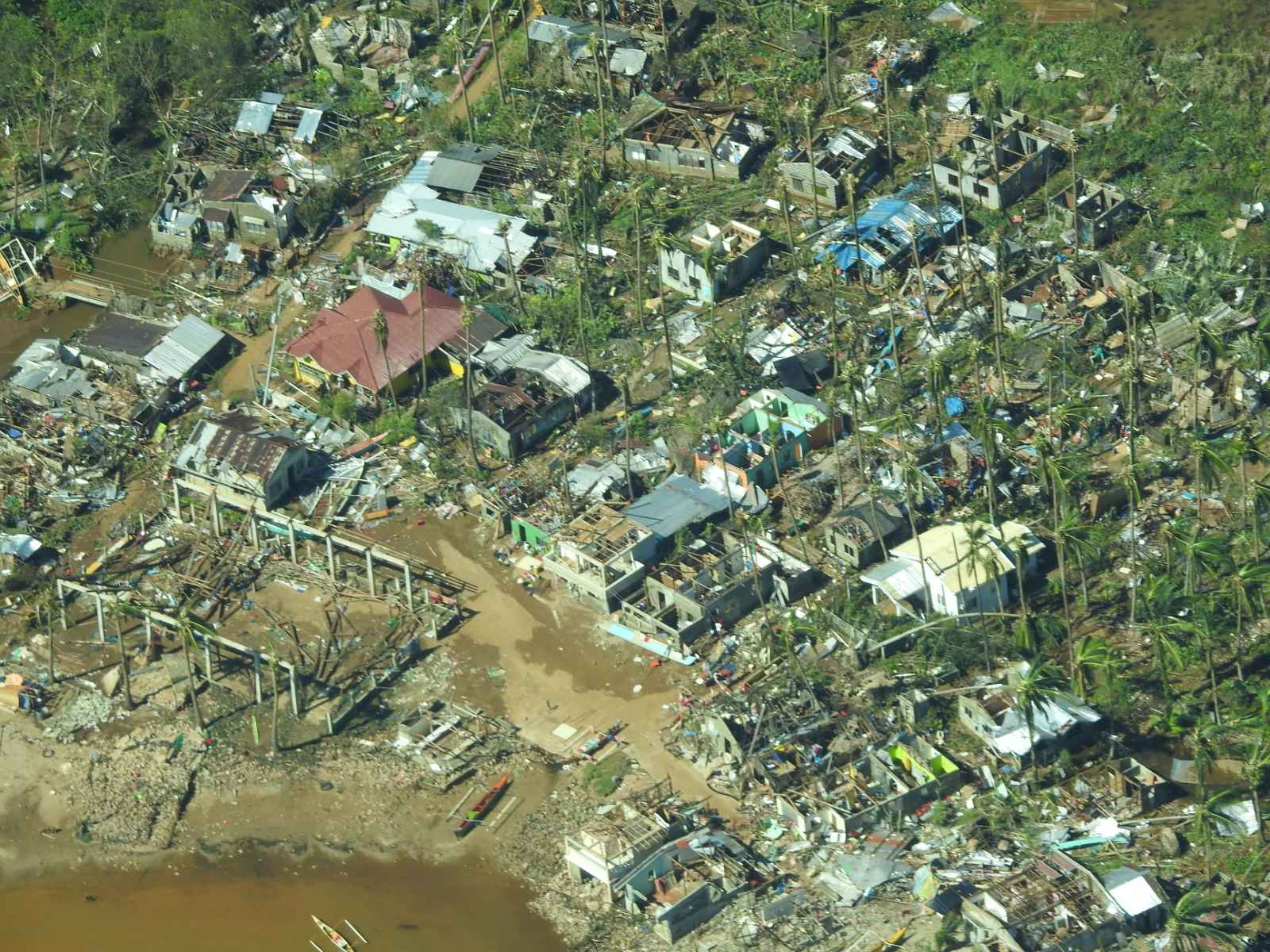
Surigao City is also toured by the Philippine Coast Guard, and heavy devastation was seen.

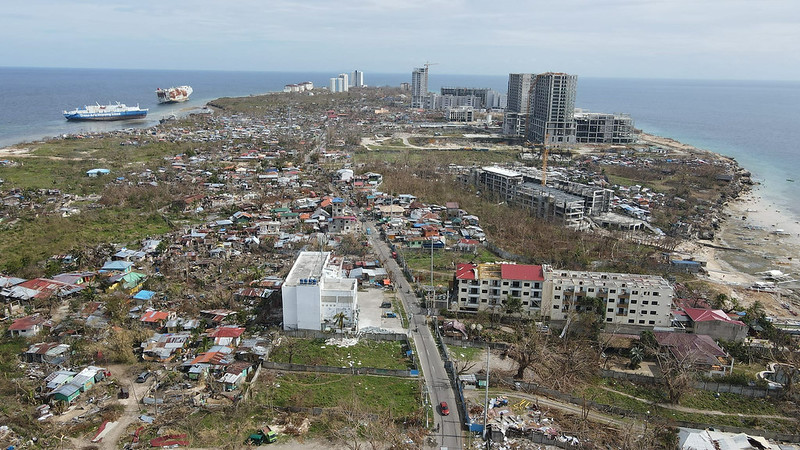
Damage in Punta Engano, Lapu Lapu City. Visible damage to concrete structures, beached ships and downed electric lines.

=== Philippines ===
Social media coverage of the typhoon was much less than expected the day after Rai. Possible effects from the newly emerged COVID-19 Omicron variant were feared to be worsened by the typhoon's effects. The DSWD further elaborated that over ₱900 million (US$18 million) worth of standby funds were already prepared for the people affected by Odette. Food and water was sparse for those impacted by the storm. The storage of COVID-19 vaccines and vaccine kits were also feared to be disrupted due to power outages. While there were reports of vaccine wastage due to the typhoon, the Department of Health assured that the impact of the typhoon was minimal. Immediately after the storm, presidential aspirants for the 2022 elections set up relief and recovery operations for the victims of the storm, particularly in Samar and Leyte provinces. Major telecommunication networks in the country reported communication disruptions in Visayas and Mindanao but assured that their respective teams are trying to restore services. Other local government units sent aid to the areas severely affected by the typhoon.

On December 17, the provinces of Cebu and Bohol were placed into a state of calamity due to widespread damages. Philippine president Rodrigo Duterte announced that he will tour Leyte, Surigao, Bohol and Cebu to check the situation there. Recovery funds up to ₱2 billion (US$40 million) were promised by the national government for the affected areas of the storm. Duterte started to tour Surigao City, Siargao, Maasin, and Dinagat Islands on December 18. Aid teams were not able to enter into certain affected areas due to waterlogging, debris, and other obstacles. Thousands of emergency personnel were deployed. 2 people died of dehydration after Rai passed. Catholic Bishops in the country declared Christmas Day and December 26 as national days of prayer and mourning for Rai's victims. The government's promise for 35,000 food packs took longer than expected to arrive, and was found to not be enough for people affected. Days later in Bohol, power outages still ranged in the millions. The province's governor, Arthur C. Yap, feared the situation could worsen due to a lack of a contingency fund, with supplies of necessities running dry. Looting as a potential problem also rose among affected populations.

==== Lack of media coverage capacity ====
News coverage regarding the impacts of Rai was limited in the days after the typhoon struck, a fact partly attributed to the shutdown of the regional news stations of media network ABS-CBN, which had earlier been denied a renewal of its congressional franchise. With internet service knocked out and mobile phone networks brought down in the wake of the typhoon, news from the typhoon-hit areas was very limited in the critical first days after the disaster.

==== International response ====
After Rai hit the Philippines, the governments of Canada, China, the United Kingdom, European Union, South Korea, Singapore, Japan and the United Nations had so far announced their intention to assist the country.

- United States: Provided 20,000 food rations to affected areas, 19 trucks for relief operations, and logistics assistance.
- China: Sent 20,000 food packs worth ₱8 million (US$162,436.55) and 4.725 million kilograms of rice to typhoon-stricken areas in the country.
- European Union: Provided an initial €1.7 million (₱95 million) for the victims of Typhoon Rai.
- South Korea: Provided US$2 million in immediate funds to support people affected.
- Singapore: Provided US$50,000 via the Singapore Red Cross Society, with the Singaporean government contributing another US$60,000 (which also went towards relief efforts on the floods in Malaysia).
- Japan: Provided emergency assistance packs consisting of generators, sleeping mattresses and pads, and dome tents via the Japan International Cooperation Agency.
- United Nations: Provided core relief products including solar lamps, hygiene kits and mosquito nets to the severely impacted islands via the United Nations High Commissioner for Refugees.

Apple CEO Tim Cook pledged to commit itself to rebuilding communities in both Malaysia and the Philippines while also providing short term relief and recovery efforts.

=== Lawsuits ===
In 2025, lawyers representing 103 survivors of Rai in the Philippines filed a lawsuit in the United Kingdom against Shell plc for damages related to climate change caused by the energy firm's carbon emissions.

== Retirement ==
Due to the extensive damage and high death toll that the typhoon caused in the Visayas and Mindanao, PAGASA announced that the name Odette will be retired from the rotating list of typhoon names, and will never again be used for another typhoon name within the PAR. On March 21, 2022, the agency chose the name Opong as its replacement for the 2025 season, but was also retired despite being use for the first time.

In April 2023, the Typhoon Committee announced that the name Rai, along with two others will be removed from the naming lists. In the spring of 2024, the name was replaced with Sarbul, which refers to "monsoon" in the Yapese language.

== See also ==
- Weather of 2021
- Tropical cyclones in 2021
- List of super typhoons
- Typhoon Louise (Ining, 1964) – took a similar path and also attained Category 5 intensity at a low latitude like Rai
- Typhoon Nelson (Bising, 1982) – another destructive typhoon that took a similar path
- Typhoon Ike (Nitang, 1984) – deadliest typhoon to hit the Caraga region
- Typhoon Mike (Ruping, 1990) – another Category 5-equivalent typhoon that took an identical track in November 1990
- Typhoon Utor (Seniang, 2006) – Also had a similar path with a second peak in the South China Sea
- Tropical Storm Washi (Sendong, 2011) – a very deadly tropical storm that took a similar path which cause devastating flash floods in Mindanao.
- Typhoon Bopha (Pablo, 2012) – strongest typhoon to hit Mindanao which took a similar path and attained Category 5 intensity at a low latitude like Rai
- Typhoon Haiyan (Yolanda, 2013) – deadliest typhoon to strike the Philippines in modern history and affected the same areas as Rai
- Typhoon Rammasun (Glenda, 2014) – violent typhoon that also strengthened into a Category 5 typhoon in the South China Sea after ravaged over Luzon.
- Tropical Storm Megi (Agaton, 2022) – a weak but deadly tropical storm that impacted the same areas 4 months later
- Typhoon Kalmaegi (Tino, 2025) – another typhoon that took a similar path, causing devastating flash floods in the Visayas
