= Typhoon Nelson (1982) =

Pacific typhoon in 1982

Typhoon Nelson (Bising)
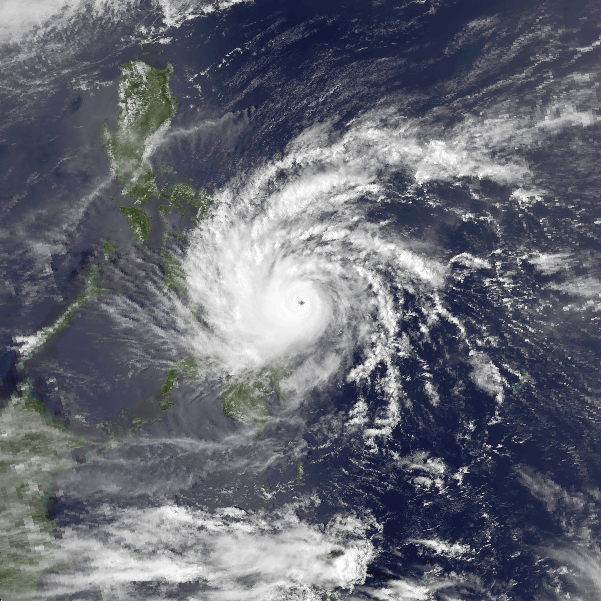
- Typhoon Nelson on March 25

Meteorological history
- Formed: March 19, 1982
- Dissipated: April 1, 1982

Very strong typhoon
- 10-minute sustained (JMA)
- Highest winds: 185 km/h (115 mph)
- Lowest pressure: 930 hPa (mbar); 27.46 inHg

Category 3-equivalent typhoon
- 1-minute sustained (SSHWS/JTWC)
- Highest winds: 205 km/h (125 mph)
- Lowest pressure: 934 hPa (mbar); 27.58 inHg

Overall effects
- Fatalities: 56
- Damage: $17.2 million (1982 USD)
- Areas affected: Philippines
- IBTrACS
- Part of the 1982 Pacific typhoon season

Typhoon Nelson, known in the Philippines as Typhoon Bising, was the second tropical cyclone to strike the Philippines within a week in March 1982. Nelson originated from a tropical disturbance southeast of Guam towards the middle of March. Although the system was initially poorly organized, it developed rather quickly, and was upgraded into Tropical Storm Nelson on March 19. It tracked westward, and fluctuated in intensity for several days. On March 24, Typhoon Nelson intensified into a typhoon, and entered an episode of rapid intensification. On March 25, Nelson reached its peak intensity of 115 km/h (70 mph), but thereafter moved ashore on the Philippines, where the storm weakened significantly. On March 27, the typhoon entered the South China Sea, and the next day, briefly re-intensified before resuming a weakening trend. Nelson dissipated on March 31.

Affecting the nation less than a week after Tropical Storm Mamie did, Nelson was responsible for additional flooding across much of the Philippines. Fifty-six people were killed due to the typhoon, eight of whom perished due to drownings. Over 1,200 homes were destroyed. More than 165,000 people fled to shelters, including 83,000 that were displaced from their home. Thirty fishing boats and 23 ferries were destroyed due to the system. Damage amounted to $17.2 million (1982 USD). (Note: All currencies are converted to United States Dollars using with an exchange rate of the year 1982.)

== Meteorological history ==
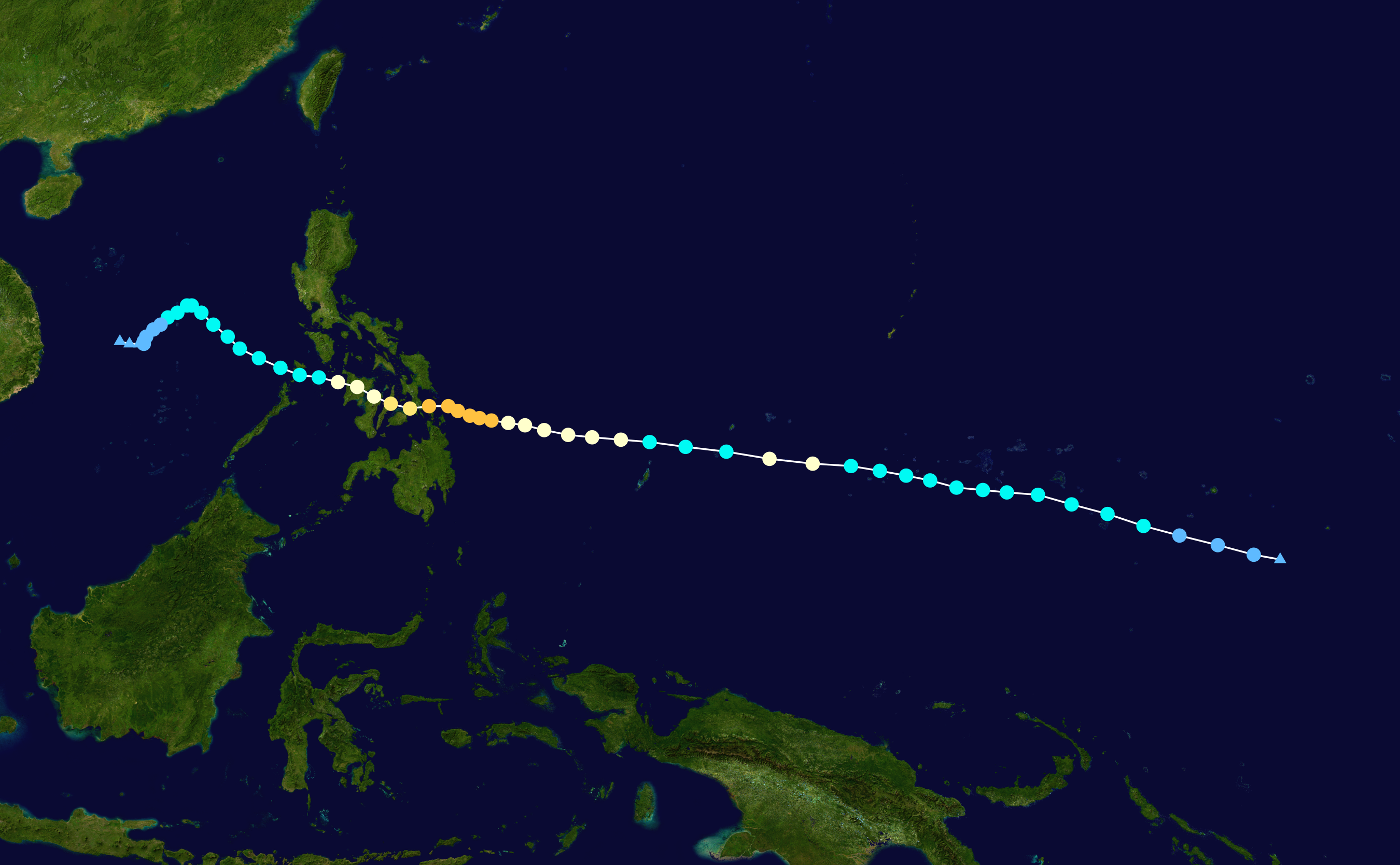
Map plotting the storm's track and intensity, according to the Saffir–Simpson scale Map key Saffir–Simpson scale Tropical depression (≤38 mph, ≤62 km/h) Tropical storm (39–73 mph, 63–118 km/h) Category 1 (74–95 mph, 119–153 km/h) Category 2 (96–110 mph, 154–177 km/h) Category 3 (111–129 mph, 178–208 km/h) Category 4 (130–156 mph, 209–251 km/h) Category 5 (≥157 mph, ≥252 km/h) Unknown Storm type Tropical cyclone Subtropical cyclone Extratropical cyclone, remnant low, tropical disturbance, or monsoon depression

The second of three early season tropical cyclones to form in the West Pacific basin, Typhoon Nelson can be traced back to a low latitude area of disturbed in mid-March. (Note: Wind estimates from the JMA and most other basins throughout the world are sustained over 10 minutes, while estimates from the United States-based Joint Typhoon Warning Center are sustained over 1 minute. 10 minute winds are about 1.14 times the amount of 1 minute winds.) The Japan Meteorological Agency (JMA) started watching the system at 0000 UTC on March 18 (Note: The Japan Meteorological Agency is the official Regional Specialized Meteorological Center for the western Pacific Ocean.) while a Tropical Cyclone Formation Alert (TCFA) was issued. Initially, the system was disorganized, but the disturbance was located in a favorable environment aloft and began to develop rapidly. Ten hours after the TCFA, the JTWC upgraded the system into a tropical depression. Early on March 19, the JMA classified the system as a tropical storm. Later that morning, Hurricane Hunters reported winds of 95 km/h (60 mph) and a barometric pressure of 993 mbar (29.3 inHg). Based on this, the JTWC designated the system as Tropical Storm Nelson.

Nelson tracked westward, staying south of a large subtropical ridge. Despite the aforementioned favorable environment, Nelson briefly weakened late on March 19, but re-intensified slightly the following morning. Shortly thereafter, the JTWC upgraded the system into a typhoon. Further intensification was halted due to increased easterly wind shear, and the storm began to level off in intensity as it accelerated on a westward course. On March 21, the JMA declared Nelson a severe tropical storm. According to the JTWC, the storm fluctuated between tropical storm and typhoon status for about 60 hours, even though the JMA suggest that Nelson did not become a typhoon until March 24. Around this time, the Philippine Atmospheric, Geophysical and Astronomical Services Administration (PAGASA) also started monitoring the storm, assigning it with the local name Bising.

After becoming a typhoon, Nelson forward's speed began to slow down as the storm began to move away from the ridge and encounter more conducive conditions. Consequently, Typhoon Nelson began to deepen more rapidly, and by the afternoon of March 25, both the JTWC and JMA increased the intensity to 185 km/h (115 mph). Although the JMA suggests the system reached its peak intensity at that time, the JTWC indicated that Nelson strengthen slightly on March 25, and attained winds of 195 km/h (120 mph), equivalent to a major hurricane or a Category 3 system on the United States-based Saffir-Simpson Hurricane Wind Scale. Shortly thereafter, the storm moved ashore in the Philippine at peak intensity. After making landfall, Nelson weakened over the south-central portion of the nation. By March 26, the JMA had lowered the winds to 160 km/h (100 mph).

By March 27, Nelson re-emerged into the South China Sea, having weakened considerably, and data from both the JMA and JTWC indicated that Nelson was no longer a typhoon. The next day, Nelson briefly re-intensified slightly, and at 1800 UTC on March 28, the JMA estimated a secondary peak intensity of 105 km/h (65 mph). On the following day, Nelson resumed weakening due to increased wind shear. Despite the presence of a trough, Nelson did not recurve northeast, and instead meandered westward. On the afternoon of March 31, the JMA ceased watching Nelson. On the next day, the JTWC followed suit while located about 450 km (280 mi) east of Nha Trang, Vietnam.

== Preparations and impact ==
Typhoon Nelson was the second storm to strike the Philippines within a week, following Tropical Storm Mamie, which claimed 54 lives. Considered a "pre-season" storm by newspapers, Nelson required storm warnings for parts of the nation, which were broadcast via radio. Much of the southern section of the Philippines were placed on typhoon alert. Due to the threat of storm surge, residents in coastal areas were advised to evacuate to higher ground.

Typhoon Nelson was responsible for significant flooding across the Philippines. On the offshore Leyte Island, a radio transmitter and a school were destroyed. In Cebu City, schools, businesses, and government offices were closed for a day. Across the low-lying town of Abucay, flooding occurred. A total of 1,261 dwellings were leveled, including 703 houses destroyed in the provinces of Cebu, Bohol, and Surigao, leaving approximately 83,000 people homeless. In Loreto Town, part of the Suriago Province, 95% of all coconut trees were toppled, and all but 45 of the town's 600 houses were demolished. A total of 165,462 persons evacuated to shelters. Widespread power outages occurred while many bridges were washed away. Shipping and air services were halted; 30 fishing boats and 23 ferries were destroyed. In all, 56 people perished due to Typhoon Nelson. Ten died in the hard-hit Leyte Province. At least eight of the casualties were due to drownings, which included two women and an infant. Overall, damage from Nelson amounted to $17.2 million, crop and property damage alone totaled $7.4 million.

== See also ==
- Typhoon Hagupit (2014)
- Typhoon Lee (1981)
- Typhoon Irma (1981)
- Typhoon Rai (2021)
- Typhoon Kalmaegi (2025)
