= List of named storms (W) =

Storms are named for historical reasons to avoid confusion when communicating with the public, as more than one storm can exist at a time. Names are drawn in order from predetermined lists. For tropical cyclones, names are assigned when a system has one-, three-, or ten-minute winds of more than 65 km/h (40 mph). Standards, however, vary from basin to basin. For example, some tropical depressions are named in the Western Pacific, while within the Australian and Southern Pacific regions, the naming of tropical cyclones are delayed until they have gale-force winds occurring more than halfway around the storm center.

This list covers the letter W.

== Storms ==
Note: † indicates the name was retired after that usage in the respective basin

- Waka (2001)† – one of the most damaging tropical cyclones to hit the island of Tonga in the South Pacific.
- Walding

- 1965 – caused heavy rains in Japan, 98 people were killed and 9 were missing due to the resulting flooding and landslides; also known as Trix beyond the Philippine Area of Responsibility (PAR).
- 1977 – a powerful category 4 typhoon that changed course before reaching the coast of the Philippines; also known as Lucy beyond the PAR.
- 1981 – a category 2 typhoon that passed off the coast of Japan; also known as Gay beyond the PAR.
- 1989 – an intense typhoon in the Philippine Sea; also known as Irma beyond the PAR.
- 1993 – a Category 3 typhoon that made landfall in southern China; also known as Abe beyond the PAR.

- Waldo

- 1985 – struck western Mexico and later brought heavy rainfall to the central United States, killing one person.
- 1998 – tropical storm that hit Japan.

- Wali (2014) – remained southeast of Hawaii.
- Wallie (1965) – struck southern Mexico.
- Wally

- 1976 – formed, moved offshore, and later dissipated over Western Australia.
- 1980† – killed 18 people when it struck Fiji.

- Walt

- 1991 – intense typhoon that passed northeast of Luzon; also known as Karing within the PAR.
- 1994 – moved across southwestern Japan; also known as Miding within the PAR.

- Walter

- 1990 – tropical cyclone in central Indian Ocean; renamed Gregoara upon crossing 90º E.
- 2001 – passed near Christmas Island and the Cocos Islands.

- Wanda

- 1945 – tropical storm that moved from the Philippines through the South China Sea.
- 1951 – typhoon that moved through the Philippines, killing 82.
- 1956 – typhoon that killed over 4,000 people in China.
- 1959 – short-lived storm east of Hawaii.
- 1962 – the most intense tropical cyclone on record in Hong Kong.
- 1965 – April typhoon that dissipated near Palau.
- 1967 – slow-moving typhoon that passed east of Japan.
- 1971 – struck Vietnam, killing 56 people and grounding air operations in the ongoing war; also known as Diding within the PAR.
- 1974 (January) – tropical storm that remained northeast of the Philippines; also known as Atang within the PAR.
- 1974 (January)† – tropical storm that struck near Brisbane, Australia, killing 16 people.
- 1977 – short-lived tropical storm south of Japan.
- 2021 – a weak storm that meandered in the open Atlantic; developed from an extratropical nor'easter that affected much of the Northeastern United States.

- Ward

- 1992 – developed in the central Pacific Ocean then crossed the International Dateline and remained away from landmasses.
- 1995 – intense typhoon that passed south of Japan; also known as Neneng within the PAR.
- 2009 – a weak cyclonic storm that struck Sri Lanka.

- Warling

- 1971 – a Category 1 Typhoon that struck Taiwan causing severe flooding in Taipei; also known as Agnes beyond the PAR.
- 1979 – the most intense tropical cyclone ever recorded with a minimum pressure of 870 mb. Tip also remains the largest tropical cyclone worldwide, with a wind diameter up to 1,380 miles (2,220 km) across. Tip weakened to a Category 1 typhoon before making landfall in Japan, killing nearly 100 people.
- 1983 – killed 170 people when it drifted off the eastern Philippines, mostly related to the sinking of the MV Dona Cassandra; also known as Orchid beyond the PAR.
- 1991 – crossed the central Philippines; also known as Wilda beyond the PAR.

- Warren

- 1981 – struck Hainan Island and Vietnam.
- 1984 – meandered in the South China Sea due to the larger Typhoon Vanessa; also known as Reming within the PAR.
- 1988 – struck southeastern China, where it destroyed 13,000 homes and killed 17; also known as Hauning beyond the PAR.
- 1995† – struck Australia's Northern Territory.

- Wasa (1991)† – powerful cyclone that left heavy damage in French Polynesia, later renamed Arthur.
- Washi

- 2005 – struck Hainan and Vietnam.
- 2011† – a late-season tropical cyclone that caused around 1,200 to 1,500 deaths and catastrophic damage in the Philippines.

- Wati

- 2006 – approached and moved southeastward away from the east coast of Australia.
- 2026 – a Category 2 tropical cyclone that remained in the open ocean.

- Watorea (1976)† – moved along the east coast of Australia.
- Wayne

- 1979 – dissipated over Luzon.
- 1983 – typhoon that killed 137 when it bypassed Luzon and Taiwan before striking southeastern China.
- 1986 – lasted 22 days around the South China Sea, killing 490 in adjacent land masses.
- 1989 – typhoon that struck Japan, killing 7.

- Weling

- 1978 – crossed the Philippines and later struck southern China.
- 1982 – a destructive typhoon that moved through Vietnam and the Philippines during October 1982.
- 1986 – passed northeast of Luzon.
- 1994 – brushed northern Luzon before crossing Hainan and Vietnam.

- Welming (1967)† – the second super Typhoon to hit the Philippines just 2 weeks after Typhoon Carla.
- Welpring

- 1964 – moved across Japan
- 1976 – an intense typhoon that recurved northeast of the Philippines.
- 1980 – passed south of Japan
- 1984 – meandered off the east coast of the Philippines.
- 1988 – developed over the Philippines and struck southern Vietnam.
- 2000 – PAGASA name for Typhoon Soulik, which lasted until early January 2001.

- Wendy

- 1957 – crossed northern Luzon and southeastern China, killing 16.
- 1960 – struck the Japanese island of Shikoku as a typhoon.
- 1963 – hit Taiwan and eastern China.
- 1965 – passed southeast of Japan.
- 1968 – passed south of Taiwan and Hong Kong before striking southern China in Guangdong.
- 1971 – passed east of Japan before dissipating over the Kamkatchka Peninsula
- 1972† – a powerful cyclone that passed near Solomon Islands and New Caledonia.
- 1974 – drifted near Luzon and Taiwan.
- 1978 – typhoon that crossed Okinawa and later Kyushu.
- 1999 – deadly tropical storm that killed 133 when it brushed Luzon and struck Guangdong in southern China.

- Wene (2000) – crossed from the western Pacific into the central Pacific as a tropical storm.
- Weng (2003) – crossed the Philippines and dissipated over Hainan, killing 13 people.
- Wening

- 1966 – dissipated north of Luzon.
- 1970 – crossed southern Luzon before dissipating over the South China Sea off the Vietnamese coast.
- 1974 – a category 2 typhoon hitting northern Luzon.

- Wes (1998) – killed 10 people while moving near French Polynesia.
- Wila (1988) – short-lived tropical storm southeast of Hawaii.
- Wilda

- 1955 – developed near the Marshall Islands and remained east of Guam.
- 1959 – struck southern China and South Korea as a tropical depression.
- 1961 – brought flooding rains to eastern Vietnam.
- 1964 – killed 42 people when it struck Japan as a typhoon.
- 1967 – remained east of the Philippines.
- 1970 – typhoon that killed 11 people when it struck the Japanese island of Kyushu.
- 1973 – developed over Luzon and hit southeastern China in Fujian.
- 1976 – hit western Japan.
- 1991 – moved across the Philippines.
- 1994 – remained east of Guam and Japan.

- Wilf (1979) – formed southwest of Indonesia, and was renamed Tropical Cyclone Danitza upon crossing 90º E.
- Wilfred (2020) – formed south of the Cabo Verde Islands, and remained out to sea.
- Willa

- 1962 – short-lived tropical storm west of Mexico.
- 1988 – formed well to the southeast of the Hawaiian Islands, never threatened land.
- 2018 – a powerful tropical cyclone that brought torrential rains and destructive winds to southwestern Mexico, particularly the states of Sinaloa and Nayarit.

- William

- 1983 – formed near French Polynesia.
- 1995† – damaging cyclone in the Cook Islands and French Polynesia.

- Willy

- 1984 – formed and dissipated west of Australia.
- 1994 – passed near Cocos Islands.
- 2005 – developed and dissipated off Western Australia.

- Wilma

- 1952 – a Category 5 super typhoon that affected the Philippines and mainland Southeast Asia.
- 1975 – formed in the Arafura Sea and made landfall in the Northern Territory of Australia.
- 2005† – an extremely powerful and destructive Category 5 hurricane that impacted Jamaica, Central America, Yucatán Peninsula, Cuba, South Florida, Bahamas, and Atlantic Canada.
- 2011† – a Category 4 tropical cyclone that affected the Samoan Islands, Tonga and New Zealand.
- 2013 – a long-lived storm that traversed the Philippines, mainland Southeast Asia, and then the Bay of Bengal before making landfall in India.
- 2025 – a tropical depression that made landfall in the Philippines.

- Wini (1987) – left heavy damage when it passed near the Samoas.
- Winifred

- 1986† – one of the worst tropical cyclones to make landfall in northern Queensland on record.
- 1992 – a Category 3 hurricane that made landfall southeast of Manzanillo, Colima, causing minor damage.

- Winnie

- 1953 – remained northeast of Guam.
- 1958 – killed 31 people while crossing Taiwan.
- 1961 – struck Bangladesh, killing 11,468 people.
- 1964 – crossed the Philippines and Hainan, killing around 100 people.
- 1966 – hit Japan and South Korea as a tropical storm.
- 1969 – dissipated between Luzon and Taiwan.
- 1972 – hit eastern China as a tropical storm.
- 1975 – typhoon that remained east of Japan.
- 1978 (March) – cyclone off the west coast of Australia.
- 1978 (November) – tropical storm that passed of Guam.
- 1983 – the only December Pacific hurricane on record, which stalled off the southwest coast of Mexico.
- 1997 – long-tracked typhoon that killed 372 people when it passed north of Taiwan and moved ashore in Zhejiang.
- 2004† – weak but deadly tropical depression that moved across the Philippines, killing at least 842 people.

- Winona

- 1982 – killed people while crossing Luzon.
- 1985 – damaged 7,500 houses in southeastern China.
- 1989 – rare January Central Pacific storm that crossed much of the Pacific Ocean.
- 1990 – developed from the remnants of Tropical Storm Tasha, and later struck Japan.
- 1993 – moved across the Philippines and South China Sea.

- Winsome (2001) – killed two people when it struck Australia's Northern Territory.
- Winston (2016)† – strongest storm to hit Fiji on record, leaving 44 fatalities and US$1.6 billion in damage.
- Wipha

- 2007 – passed just north of Taiwan before striking Zhejiang, leaving US$1.3 billion in damage.
- 2013 – struck southeastern Japan, killing 41 people.
- 2013 – a large typhoon that caused extensive damage in Japan in mid-October 2013.
- 2019 – caused significant damages in Vietnam and China.
- 2025† – Category 1 typhoon that impacted the Philippines, China, Vietnam and Thailand.

- Wukong

- 2000 – struck Hainan and northern Vietnam.
- 2006 – tropical storm that dropped torrential rainfall across Japan, killing two.
- 2012 – moved across the Philippines on Christmas Day, killing 20 people.
- 2018 – a severe tropical storm that never made landfall.
- 2024 – churned in the open ocean.

- Wutip

- 2001 – intense typhoon south of Japan.
- 2007 – weak, sprawling tropical storm that killed 10 people.
- 2013 – typhoon that struck eastern Vietnam, killing 65 people.
- 2019 – category 5 typhoon that cost $3 million in damage.
- 2025 – a strong severe tropical storm that affected South China.

- Wynne

- 1980 – strongest typhoon of the season, passed through Ryukyu Islands twice.
- 1984 – passed between Taiwan and Luzon before striking China, killed three fishermen on Luzon.
- 1987 – typhoon that weakened while passing east of Japan.

== See also ==
- Tropical cyclone naming
- List of historical tropical cyclone names
