= Typhoon Andy (1982) =

Pacific typhoon in 1982

Typhoon Andy (Iliang)
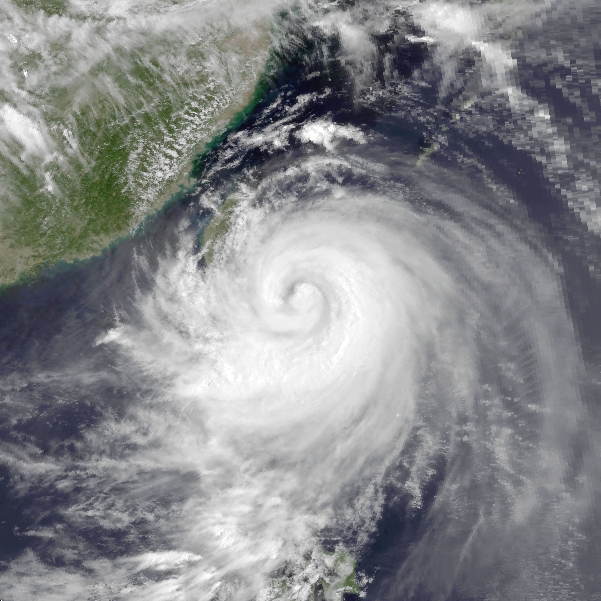
- Typhoon Andy at peak intensity on July 28

Meteorological history
- Formed: July 22, 1982
- Dissipated: July 30, 1982

Very strong typhoon
- 10-minute sustained (JMA)
- Highest winds: 185 km/h (115 mph)
- Lowest pressure: 930 hPa (mbar); 27.46 inHg

Category 4-equivalent typhoon
- 1-minute sustained (SSHWS/JTWC)
- Highest winds: 220 km/h (140 mph)
- Lowest pressure: 920 hPa (mbar); 27.17 inHg

Overall effects
- Fatalities: 13 total
- Missing: 2
- Damage: $31.3 million (1982 USD)
- Areas affected: Guam, Taiwan, Philippines, China
- IBTrACS
- Part of the 1982 Pacific typhoon season

Typhoon Andy, known in the Philippines as Typhoon Iliang, was an intense tropical cyclone that made landfall in Taiwan. Andy formed along the northern edge of the monsoon trough south of Guam on July 22, 1982. It became a tropical storm the next day, although this system was initially poorly organized. Andy moved steadily west during the first few days of its life. After looping south of Guam, the cyclone moved northwest and strengthened. Andy turned westward near the 18th parallel on July 25. The system became a strong typhoon for a prolonged period on July 27 and July 28 while attaining a peak intensity of 185 km/h (115 mph). However, the typhoon struck Southern Taiwan on July 29. Continuing westward through the Formosa Strait, the storm made its final landfall in southern China on July 30 and dissipated inland two days later.

During its formative stages, the typhoon brought high waves to Guam, resulting in one death. Twelve families were also left homeless. After passing near Taiwan, Andy brought strong winds, which resulted in thirteen deaths, and two others were rendered missing. Government offices, schools, and airports were closed. At least 60 fishing boats in harbors were damaged or wrecked due to strong winds. Three hundred power poles fell; consequently, nearly a quarter of Taiwan residents lost power at the height of the storm. After moving ashore in China, Andy brought heavy rains to nearby Hong Kong.

== Meteorological history ==
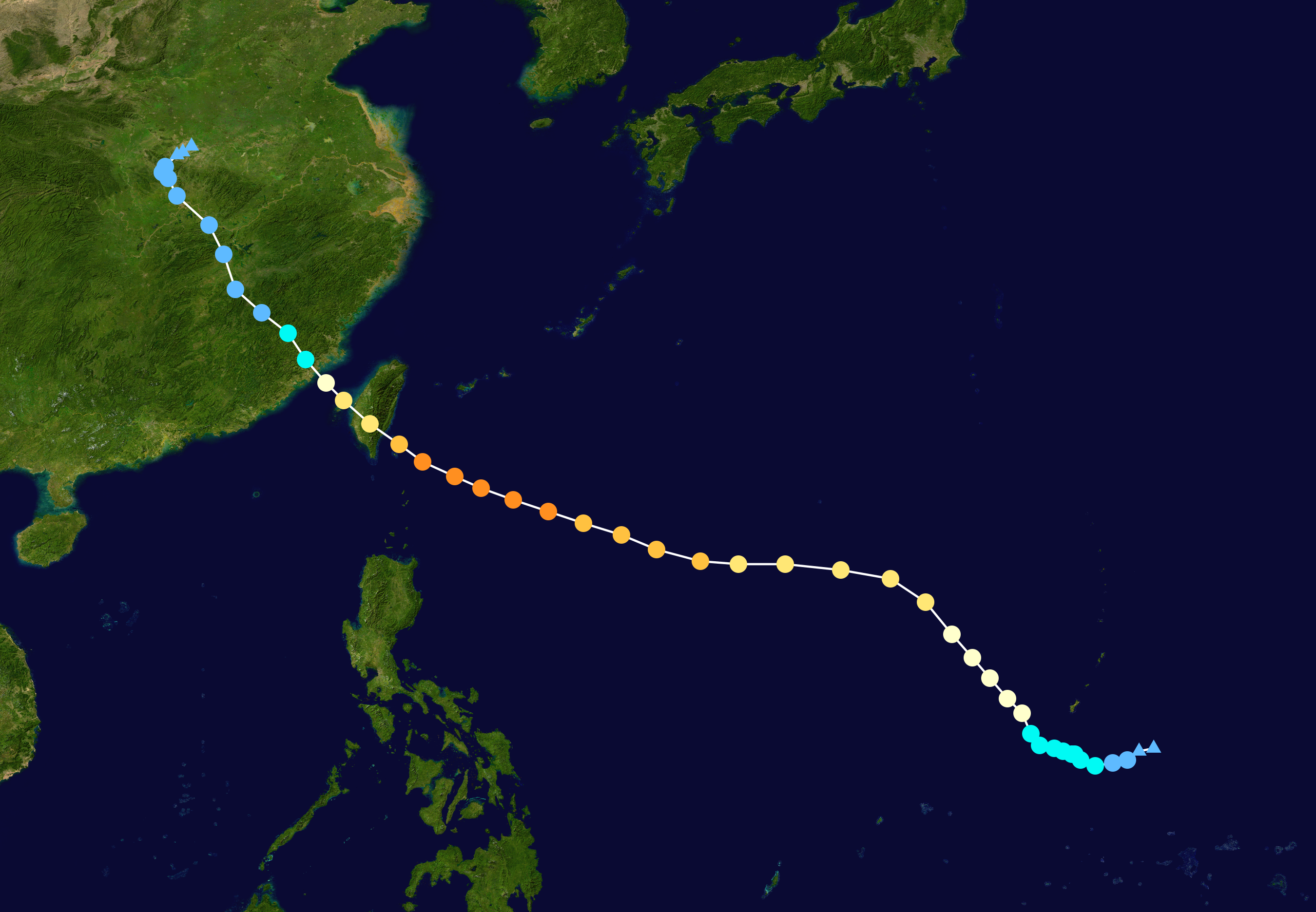
Map plotting the storm's track and intensity, according to the Saffir–Simpson scale Map key Saffir–Simpson scale Tropical depression (≤38 mph, ≤62 km/h) Tropical storm (39–73 mph, 63–118 km/h) Category 1 (74–95 mph, 119–153 km/h) Category 2 (96–110 mph, 154–177 km/h) Category 3 (111–129 mph, 178–208 km/h) Category 4 (130–156 mph, 209–251 km/h) Category 5 (≥157 mph, ≥252 km/h) Unknown Storm type Tropical cyclone Subtropical cyclone Extratropical cyclone, remnant low, tropical disturbance, or monsoon depression

Typhoon Andy originated from a monsoon trough south of Guam in tandem with Typhoon Bess. Despite strong wind shear, three areas of disturbed weather soon developed. The westernmost of the three drifted westward and remained poorly defined. Late on July 21, a Tropical Cyclone Formation Alert (TCFA) was issued for the middle system following a drop in barometric pressure and an increase in organization. (Note: Wind estimates from the JMA and most other basins throughout the world are sustained over 10 minutes, while estimates from the United States-based Joint Typhoon Warning Center are sustained over 1 minute. 10 minute winds are about 1.14 times the amount of 1 minute winds.) Around this time, the Japan Meteorological Agency (JMA) started watching the cyclone. On July 22, the JMA upgraded the system into a tropical storm. (Note: The Japan Meteorological Agency is the official Regional Specialized Meteorological Center for the western Pacific Ocean.) During the evening hours of July 22, Hurricane Hunters found winds of 65 to 70 km/h (40 to 45 mph) and a minimum pressure of 995 mbar (29.4 inHg). Based on this, the Joint Typhoon Warning Center (JTWC) classified the system as a tropical storm and named it Andy. Despite the initial overall lack of organization, Andy slowly gained strength while tracking generally westward. However, the low-level circulation was initially poorly defined and difficult to find via weather satellite imagery. While passing around 160 km (100 mi) south of Guam, the JMA upped Andy into a severe tropical storm. After performing a small loop, Andy accelerated northwest south of a subtropical ridge. According to the JMA, Andy attained typhoon intensity midday on July 24.

For the ensuing 24 hours, intensification was slight. Thereafter, Andy turned west and entered a more favorable environment for intensification. On July 25, the JMA placed the intensity of the storm at 140 km/h (85 mph). After briefly leveling off in intensity, Andy continued to gain strength, and during the morning hours of July 26, the JMA reported winds of 170 km/h (105 mph). The next day, after the storm became better organized and developed a well-defined eye, the JMA estimated that Andy reached peak intensity, with winds of 185 km/h (115 mph), and subsequently noted that Andy attained its minimum barometric pressure of 930 mbar (25 inHg). Later that day, the JTWC estimated a peak intensity of 225 km/h (140 mph), equivalent to a Category 4 hurricane on the United States-based Saffir-Simpson Hurricane Wind Scale (SSHWS).

Shortly after its peak, Andy began to slowly weaken. At 1200 UTC on July 28, the JTWC reduced the intensity of the typhoon to 210 km/h (130 mph). However, on July 29, the JMA lowered the intensity of the cyclone to 145 km/h (90 mph) as the storm's eye disappeared on satellite imagery. Nevertheless, the JTWC kept the intensity over 185 km/h (115 mph) until landfall, which occurred later that day along the southeastern quadrant of Taiwan. Despite briefly emerging into the Formosa Strait, the JMA downgraded Andy into a severe tropical storm just before landfall in Southern China. On July 30, the JTWC stopped watching Andy inland over the mountains terrain of southeastern China. Two days later, the JMA followed suit.

== Preparations and impact ==
While strengthening, Typhoon Andy passed near Guam, generating 7.6 to 9.1 m (25 to 30 ft) waves along south-facing beaches. An 11-year-old boy died in Naval Station after the waves swept him off of rocks. Three "huge" waves struck the shoreline near Umatac, which destroyed several homes off of their foundation. Along many nearby villages, scattered damage was noted. At least nine villages were without power for varying amounts of time. In all, 12 people were left homeless.

While affecting Taiwan, Typhoon Andy snapped trees and toppled billboards, in addition to generating high waves. In some places, rainfall reached 300 mm (12 in). Coastal areas were hardest hit. Along the southern portion of the island, 300 power poles were downed, making damage reports difficult for the United Press International to obtain. At the height of the storm, a quarter of the nation's 18 million residents were left without power. Eight people were killed in storm-related accidents, including a man and a woman who died when a car flipped in the central portion of the country. Furthermore, four members of a fishing party were swept out to sea and drowned and an elderly man was blown off a roof as he tried to fix leaks in it. Another 11-year-old boy was swept into the sea and was presumed to have perished while watching waves near the southeastern city of Taitung, though his 16-year-old companion who was also watching the waves was swept away, but was later rescued. In Taipei, broken trees and signboards fell on streets due to strong winds. Government offices, schools and airports were closed. One quarter of the city lost power. At least 60 fishing boats in harbors were badly damaged or wrecked in the wind. Elsewhere, a 23-man crew was forced to abandon a 5,393 short tons (4,890 t) ship off the northern Philippines. Overall, 13 people were killed, 2 were missing, and 25 others were wounded. A total of 300 homes were at least partially destroyed but no major damage was observed and no major flooding was reported. Despite this, Andy caused considerable damage in Taiwan, and losses totaled to NT$1.22535 billion (US$31.3 million).

While Andy was in Taiwan Straits, a No 1. hurricane signal was issued for Hong Kong on July 28. The next day, this was upgraded to a No. 3 hurricane signal. All signals were dropped after Andy weakened to a tropical storm. A minimum pressure of 990.5 mbar (29.25 inHg) was recorded at the Hong Kong Royal Observatory (HKO) on July 29. Waglan Island recorded a peak wind speed of 46 km/h (29 mph). Meanwhile, Green Island observed a peak wind gust of 83 km/h (52 mph). Tate's Cairn observed 205.3 mm (8.08 in) of rain during the passage of the storm, the highest in the vicinity of Hong Kong. Overall, damage in Hong Kong was minor.

== See also ==
- Typhoon Wayne (1983)
- Typhoon Winnie (1997)
- Typhoon Soudelor (2015)
- Typhoon Podul (2025)
