= Wilda =

Wilda may refer to:

- Wilda, Poznań, a southern district of the city of Poznań in western Poland
- Typhoon Wilda (disambiguation), several typhoons and tropical storms
- Wilhelm Eduard Wilda (1800–1856), German jurist
- Mema Wilda, female singer in the folk and psychedlic genre
