= List of storms named Wayne =

The name Wayne has been used for four tropical cyclones in the northwest Pacific Ocean.

- Tropical Storm Wayne (1979) (T7922, 25W) – approached the Philippines before dissipating.
- Typhoon Wayne (1983) (T8304, 04W, Karing) – approached the Philippines and Taiwan.
- Typhoon Wayne (1986) (T8614, 12W, Miding) – one of the longest-lived storms on record, approached the Philippines and struck Taiwan.
- Typhoon Wayne (1989) (T8922, 25W) – struck Japan.
