= List of storms named Winnie =

The name Winnie has been used for 13 tropical cyclones worldwide: 1 in the Eastern Pacific Ocean, 11 in the Western Pacific Ocean, and 1 in the Australian region of the Southern Indian Ocean.

In the Eastern Pacific:

- Hurricane Winnie (1983) – off-season system that dissipated before making landfall

In the Western Pacific:

- Typhoon Winnie (1953) (T5317)
- Typhoon Winnie (1958) (T5810)
- Tropical Storm Winnie (1961)
- Typhoon Winnie (1964) (T6403, 04W, Dading)
- Tropical Storm Winnie (1966) (T6615, 15W) – hit Japan
- Tropical Storm Winnie (1969) (T6906, 06W, Goring)
- Tropical Storm Winnie (1972) (T7212, 12W)
- Typhoon Winnie (1975) (T7510, 12W) – minimal typhoon that stayed at sea
- Tropical Storm Winnie (1978) (T7830, 34W) – moderately strong tropical storm
- Typhoon Winnie (1997) (T9713, 14W, Ibiang) – among the largest tropical cyclones on record; severely impacted areas of northern China
- Tropical Depression Winnie (2004) – named (and only recognized) by PAGASA, killed nearly 1,600 people and caused widespread flooding in the Philippines

The name Winnie was retired following the 2004 Pacific typhoon season and was replaced with Warren.

In the Australian region:

- Cyclone Winnie (1978)
