= List of storms named Warren =

The name Warren has been used for three tropical cyclones in the Western Pacific Ocean and for one in the Australian region of the South Pacific Ocean. Although unused by PAGASA, it replaced the name Winnie after the mass casualties it caused in the Philippines during the 2004 Pacific typhoon season

In the Western Pacific:

- Tropical Storm Warren (1981) (T8117, 21W)
- Tropical Storm Warren (1984) (T8425, 26W, Reming)
- Typhoon Warren (1988) (T8805, 06W, Huaning)

In the Australian region:

- Tropical Cyclone Warren (1995), made landfall in Northern Australia.
