= List of storms named Winona =

The name Winona has been used for six tropical cyclones in the Western Pacific Ocean:

- Tropical Storm Winona (1982) (T8208, 08W, Emang)
- Tropical Storm Winona (1985) (T8518, 19W)
- Tropical Storm Winona (1989) (T8901, 01W), formed in the Central Pacific basin, but was operationally named after crossing into the Western Pacific; traveled over 6,300 miles (10,200 km) before dissipating near the Central Philippines.
- Tropical Storm Winona (1990) (T9012, 15W), struck Japan.
- Tropical Storm Winona (1993) (T9313, 19W, Saling), struck China.
