= List of storms named Willa =

The names Willa and Wila have been used for three tropical cyclones: two in the East Pacific Ocean and one in the Central Pacific Ocean.

In the East Pacific:

- Tropical Storm Willa (1962)
- Hurricane Willa (2018) – a Category 5 hurricane that made landfall in Sinaloa at Category 3 intensity

In the Central Pacific:

- Tropical Storm Wila (1988) – did not affect land as a tropical cyclone
