= List of storms named Walter =

The name Walter has been used for two tropical cyclones in the Australian region:

- Cyclone Walter–Gregoara (1990) – long-lived cyclone that moved into the south-west Indian Ocean
- Cyclone Walter (2001) – affected Cocos Island
