= List of storms named William =

The name William has been used for two tropical cyclones, both in the South Pacific Ocean:

- Cyclone William (1983) – a Category 3 severe tropical cyclone that affected French Polynesia.
- Cyclone William (1994) – a Category 2 tropical cyclone that affected the Cook Islands and French Polynesia.

Additionally, the name William appears in List IV of the list of North Atlantic hurricane names; however, it remains unused. The closest the name could have been used was in 2012 when there was 19 named storms that year but 21 named storms was needed for use.

== See also ==
Similar names that have been used for tropical cyclones:

- Cyclone Guillaume (2002) – the French equivalent of William; used in the South-West Indian Ocean.
- List of storms named Guillermo – the Spanish equivalent of William; used in the East Pacific Ocean.
- List of storms named Willy – used in the Australian region.
