= Tropical Storm Wukong (2006) =

Pacific severe tropical storm in 2006

Severe Tropical Storm Wukong
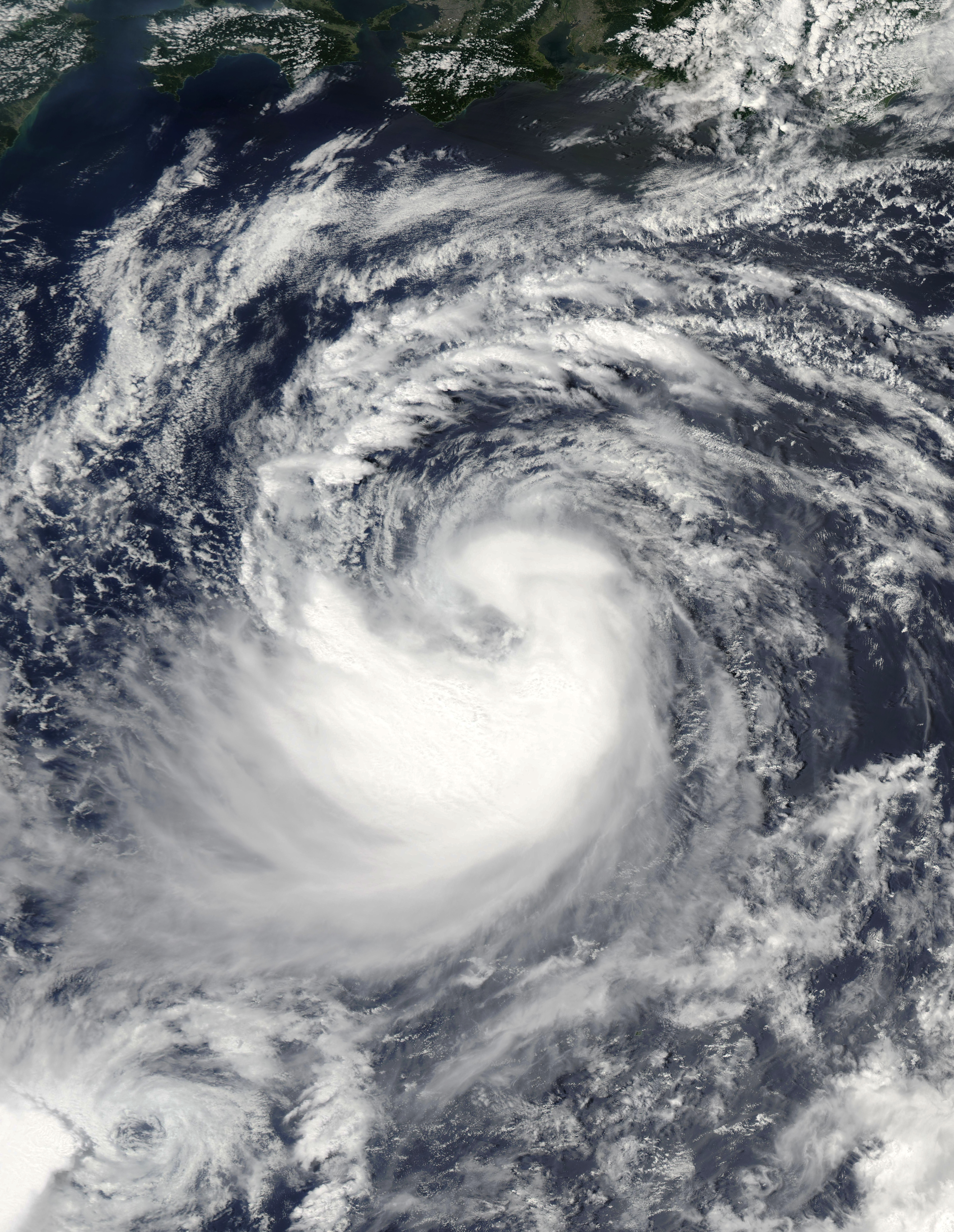
- Tropical Storm Wukong at peak intensity on August 15

Meteorological history
- Formed: August 12, 2006
- Extratropical: August 20, 2006
- Dissipated: August 23, 2006

Severe tropical storm
- 10-minute sustained (JMA)
- Highest winds: 95 km/h (60 mph)
- Lowest pressure: 980 hPa (mbar); 28.94 inHg

Tropical storm
- 1-minute sustained (SSHWS/JTWC)
- Highest winds: 100 km/h (65 mph)
- Lowest pressure: 984 hPa (mbar); 29.06 inHg

Overall effects
- Fatalities: 2 direct
- Injuries: 3
- Damage: Unknown
- Areas affected: Japan and South Korea
- IBTrACS
- Part of the 2006 Pacific typhoon season

Severe Tropical Storm Wukong was a slow-moving tropical cyclone which produced torrential rains over Japan. The tenth named storm of the 2006 Pacific typhoon season, Wukong developed out of a tropical depression over the open waters of the western Pacific Ocean. On August 13, both the Japan Meteorological Agency (JMA) and the Joint Typhoon Warning Center (JTWC) classified the depression as a tropical storm. The storm traveled along a curving path south of Japan, absorbing the remnants of Tropical Storm Sonamu on August 15 before turning towards the west. Wukong made landfall at peak intensity late on August 17 near Miyazaki City in southern Kyūshū. The cyclone remained over land for about 24 hours before moving out over the Sea of Japan. The storm weakened to a tropical depression before dissipating on August 21. Due to the slow movement of the storm, it produced heavy rains, peaking at 516 mm (20.3 in). Two people were killed due to rough seas produced by the storm and three others were injured.

== Meteorological history ==
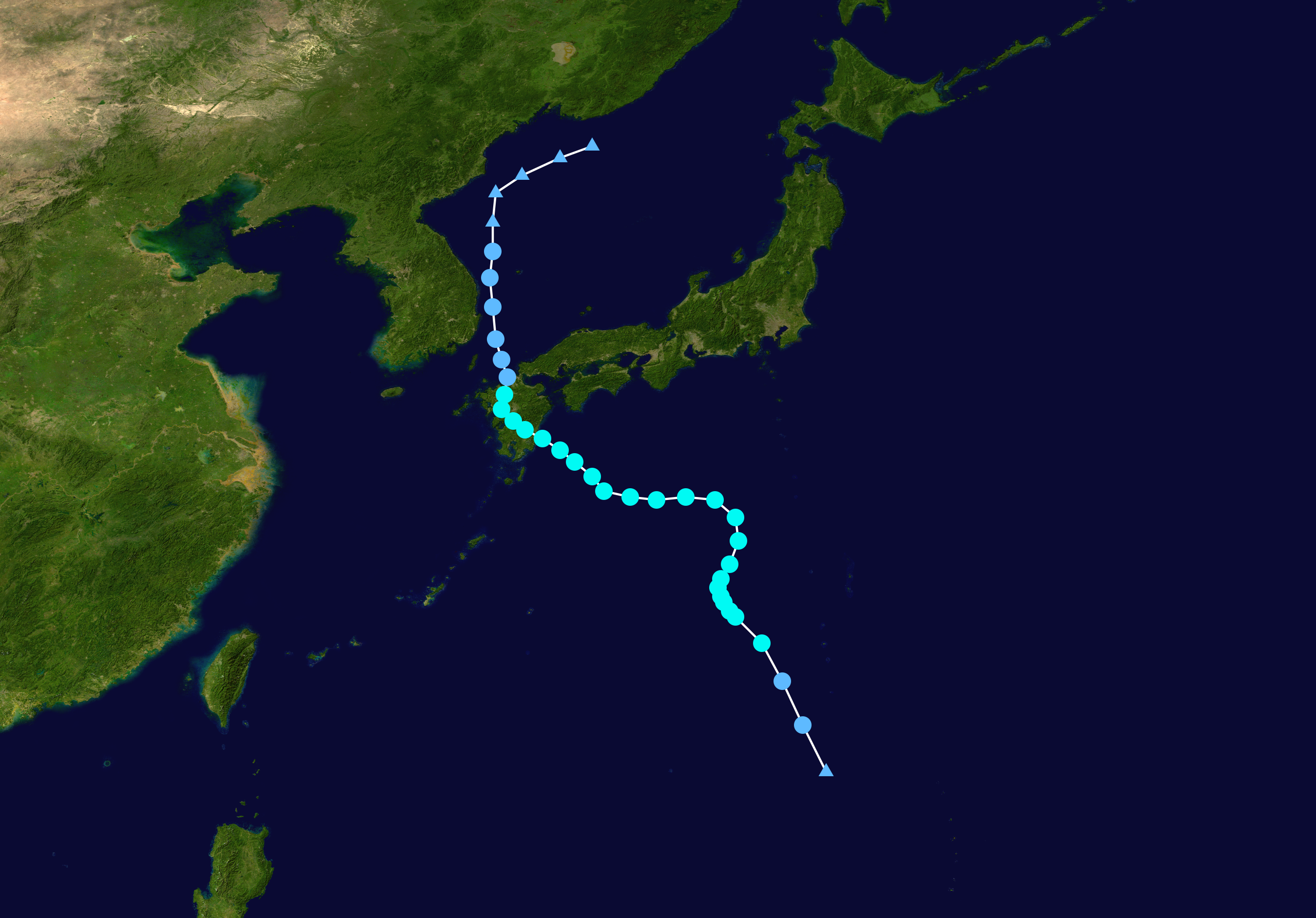
Map plotting the storm's track and intensity, according to the Saffir–Simpson scale Map key Saffir–Simpson scale Tropical depression (≤38 mph, ≤62 km/h) Tropical storm (39–73 mph, 63–118 km/h) Category 1 (74–95 mph, 119–153 km/h) Category 2 (96–110 mph, 154–177 km/h) Category 3 (111–129 mph, 178–208 km/h) Category 4 (130–156 mph, 209–251 km/h) Category 5 (≥157 mph, ≥252 km/h) Unknown Storm type Tropical cyclone Subtropical cyclone Extratropical cyclone, remnant low, tropical disturbance, or monsoon depression

On August 12, the Japan Meteorological Agency (JMA) began monitoring a tropical depression located to the south of Chichi-jima island. The depression formed within a monsoonal gyre which also spawned Tropical Storm Sonamu. The Joint Typhoon Warning Center (JTWC) classified the system as Tropical Depression 11W several hours after the JMA while the system was located about 140 km (85 mi) south of Iwo Jima. The depression gradually strengthened as it moved towards the northwest. Early on August 13, it was upgraded to a tropical storm and given the name Wukong; (Note: The name Wukong (Mandarin: 悟空, [u˥˩ kʰʊŋ˥]) was contributed by China and refers to Sun Wukong, a character in the Chinese epic Journey to the West in Mandarin.) The storm slowed significantly as a ridge built eastward over Japan. On August 14, Wukong turned towards the northeast and reached its peak intensity with winds of 95 km/h (60 mph 10-minute winds) as a severe tropical storm.

At the same time, the JTWC assessed Wukong to have reached its initial peak intensity with winds of 95 km/h (60 mph 1-minute winds). The next day, the storm began to accelerate due to an interaction with the nearby Tropical Storm Sonamu. Wukong absorbed the weakening Sonamu later in the day before turning towards the west. On August 16, the storm turned towards the northwest due to a weakness in the ridge near Japan. Wukong made landfall late on August 17 near Miyazaki City in southern Kyūshū. As the storm made landfall, the JTWC assessed Wukong to have winds of 100 km/h (65 mph 1-minute winds). The cyclone slowly traveled across land, entering the Sea of Japan about 24 hours after landfall. Several hours after entering the Sea of Japan, the JMA downgraded Wukong to a tropical depression. The depression persisted for two more days before dissipating near the Russian coastline.

== Preparations and impact ==
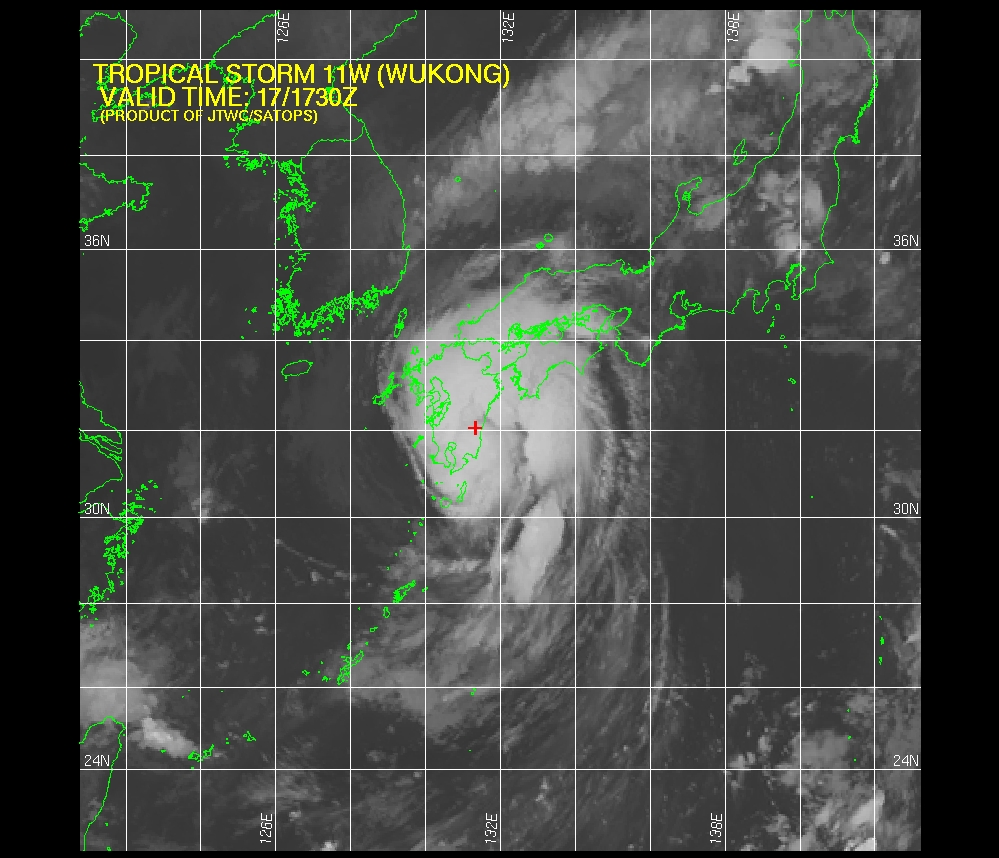
Wukong over Japan on August 17

According to Japanese weather officials, heavy rain, flood, storm and high wave warnings were put into effect for all of Kyūshū and adjacent areas in Honshū. The two largest air carriers in Japan, Japan Airlines and All Nippon Airways, cancelled at least 36 domestic flights ahead of the storm. Several of the largest oil refineries halted oil product shipments from three refineries. Kyushu Railways postponed services on five lines, one of which crossed the entire prefecture. Long distance ferries were also shut down. Iwakuni, Yamaguchi was placed under Tropical Cyclone Condition of Readiness 3 and Sasebo, Nagasaki was placed under Tropical Cyclone Condition of Readiness Storm Watch.

Wukong produced torrential rains over Japan, peaking at 516 mm (20.3 in) in Hinokage, Miyazaki Prefecture. Flooding in Kyūshū and the Yamaguchi Prefecture caused the evacuation of about 300 households. At least 200 residences were left without power in Kyūshū. Two people were killed by rough seas produced by Wukong, and three others were injured in storm-related accidents. A total of seven landslides occurred, one of which damaged several homes. As the storm brushed the Korean Peninsula, it produced heavy rains, but caused no known damage.

== See also ==
- Other tropical cyclones named Wukong
- Timeline of the 2006 Pacific typhoon season
