= Hurricane Winifred =

Category 3 Pacific hurricane in 1992

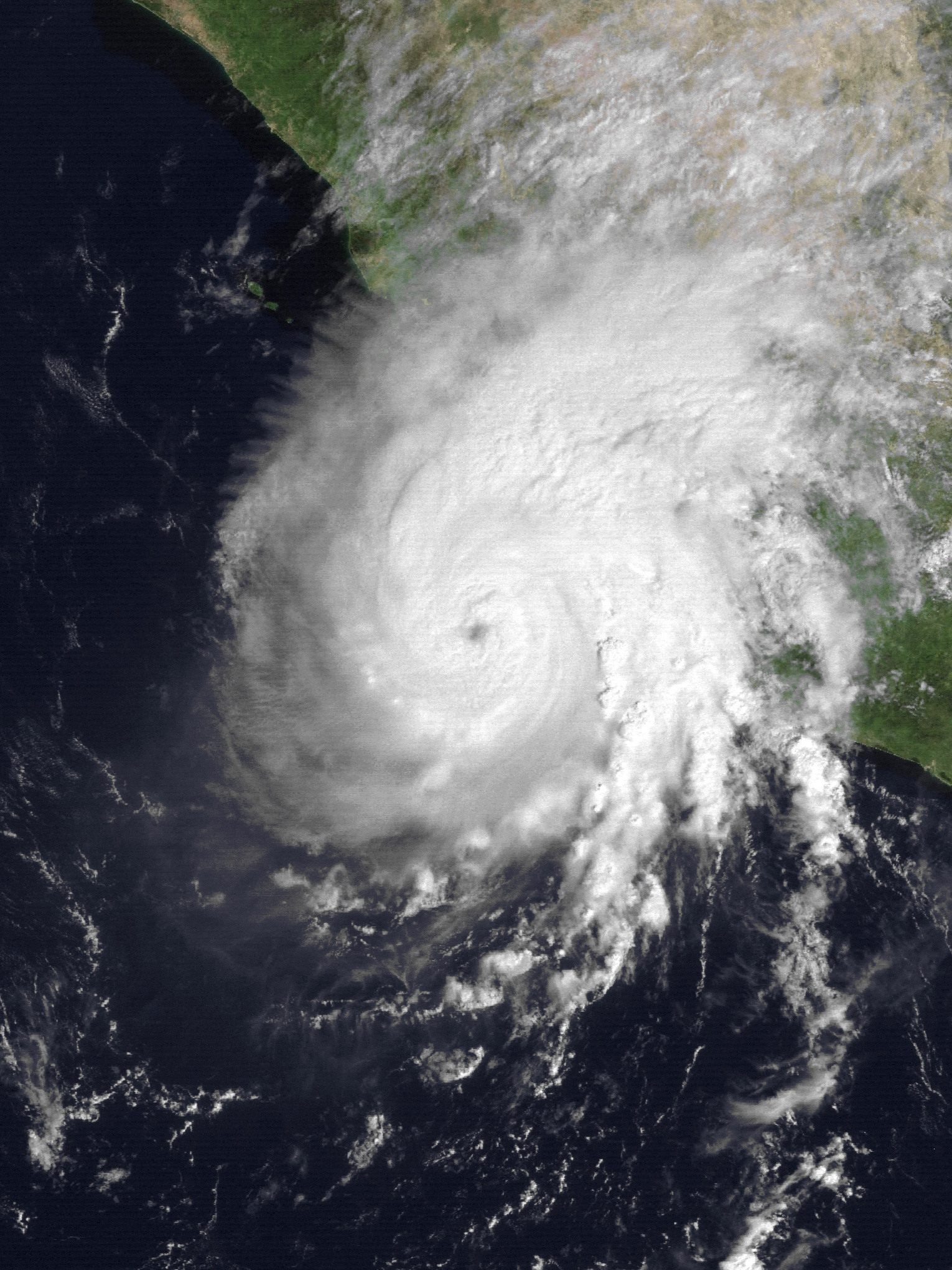
- Hurricane Winifred shortly after peak intensity on October 9

Meteorological history
- Formed: October 6, 1992
- Dissipated: October 10, 1992

Category 3 major hurricane
- 1-minute sustained (SSHWS/NWS)
- Highest winds: 115 mph (185 km/h)
- Lowest pressure: 960 mbar (hPa); 28.35 inHg

Overall effects
- Fatalities: 3 total
- Damage: $5 million (1992 USD)
- Areas affected: Western Mexico, especially Colima and Michoacán
- IBTrACS
- Part of the 1992 Pacific hurricane season

Hurricane Winifred was the last tropical cyclone to make landfall in the record-breaking 1992 Pacific hurricane season. Impacting western Mexico, especially Colima and Michoacán, Hurricane Winifred brought heavy rain and destruction to the area. Rains flooded farms and roads, and caused more than $5 million (1992 USD, $11.5 million 2026 USD) in damage and a total of three people were killed.

The last major hurricane, and hurricane of its season, Winifred existed in October 1992. It formed southeast of Acapulco on October 6 as the twenty-fourth east Pacific tropical cyclone of its season, and recurved as it strengthened. It peaked as a Category 3 hurricane on the Saffir-Simpson Hurricane Scale. It made landfall southeast of Manzanillo, Colima and dissipated inland.

== Meteorological history ==
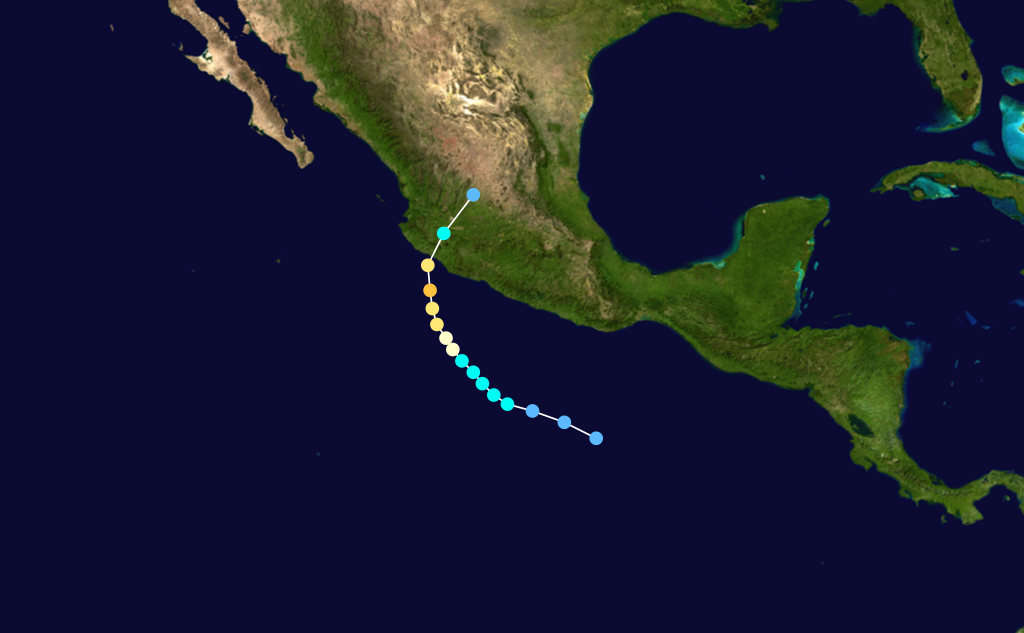
Map plotting the storm's track and intensity, according to the Saffir–Simpson scale Map key Saffir–Simpson scale Tropical depression (≤38 mph, ≤62 km/h) Tropical storm (39–73 mph, 63–118 km/h) Category 1 (74–95 mph, 119–153 km/h) Category 2 (96–110 mph, 154–177 km/h) Category 3 (111–129 mph, 178–208 km/h) Category 4 (130–156 mph, 209–251 km/h) Category 5 (≥157 mph, ≥252 km/h) Unknown Storm type Tropical cyclone Subtropical cyclone Extratropical cyclone, remnant low, tropical disturbance, or monsoon depression

On October 1, a disorganized area of thunderstorms existed south of Panama. It gradually headed west-northwestward, slowly organized, and developed deep and concentrated convection. The disturbed area had become organized enough to be considered a tropical depression. Numbered Twenty-Four-E, the cyclone was located about 460 mi (740 km) south-southeast of Acapulco. It moved towards the west-northwest at a speed of about 12 mph (19 km/h), and by the time it was located about 550 km (340 mi) south of Zihuatanejo, it had intensified into Tropical Storm Winifred.

Winifred steadily became more organized, and late on October 7, the National Hurricane Center (NHC) was anticipating Winifred to reach hurricane intensity within the next 36 hours. A large cyclone, Winifred continued to intensify. Its forward speed decreased as it started to turn to the northwest. By October 8, Winifred become a hurricane while located approximately 340 mi (545 km) south-southeast of Manzanillo. A small eye became evident on satellite imagery, and thus the winds increased to 85 mph (140 km/h).

Winifred then intensified into a moderate Category 2 hurricane on October 9. Although the eye briefly disappeared, slight intensification was anticipated. The hurricane was curved north by an upper-level trough. Winifred peaked in intensity as a major hurricane (Category 3 or higher on the Saffir-Simpson Scale). At this time, Winifred, had central pressure of 960 mb (28 inHg) and winds of 115 mph (185 km/h). This made Winifred the final hurricane– major or otherwise– of the 1992 Pacific hurricane season. However, it was operationally believed to have peaked as a Category 2 hurricane; the NHC did not issue any advisories with winds any higher than 110 mph (175 km/h).

Hurricane Winifred re-curved to the north-northeast, increased in forward speed, and slightly weakened as it approached land, with the storm's eye becoming less apparent in satellite imagery. On October 9, it made landfall in Colima about 17 mi (28 km) east-southeast of Manzanillo. At the time it was a Category 2 hurricane with winds of 100 mph (160 km/h) and a central pressure of 975 mb (28.8 inHg). Hurricane Winifred quickly weakened after landfall, and weakened to a tropical storm less than three hours later, which was early on October 10. Later on October 10, Winifred weakened to a tropical depression, before dissipating over the mountains of central Mexico.

== Preparations and impact ==
Five thousand people were evacuated to emergency shelters as Winifred neared. With the approach of the hurricane, watches and warnings were issued. On October 9 a tropical storm warning was issued from Zihuatanejo to Cabo Corrientes. At the same time, a hurricane watch went into effect in the same area. The watch was later replaced with a hurricane warning 12 hours later. On October 10, all watches and warnings were dropped.

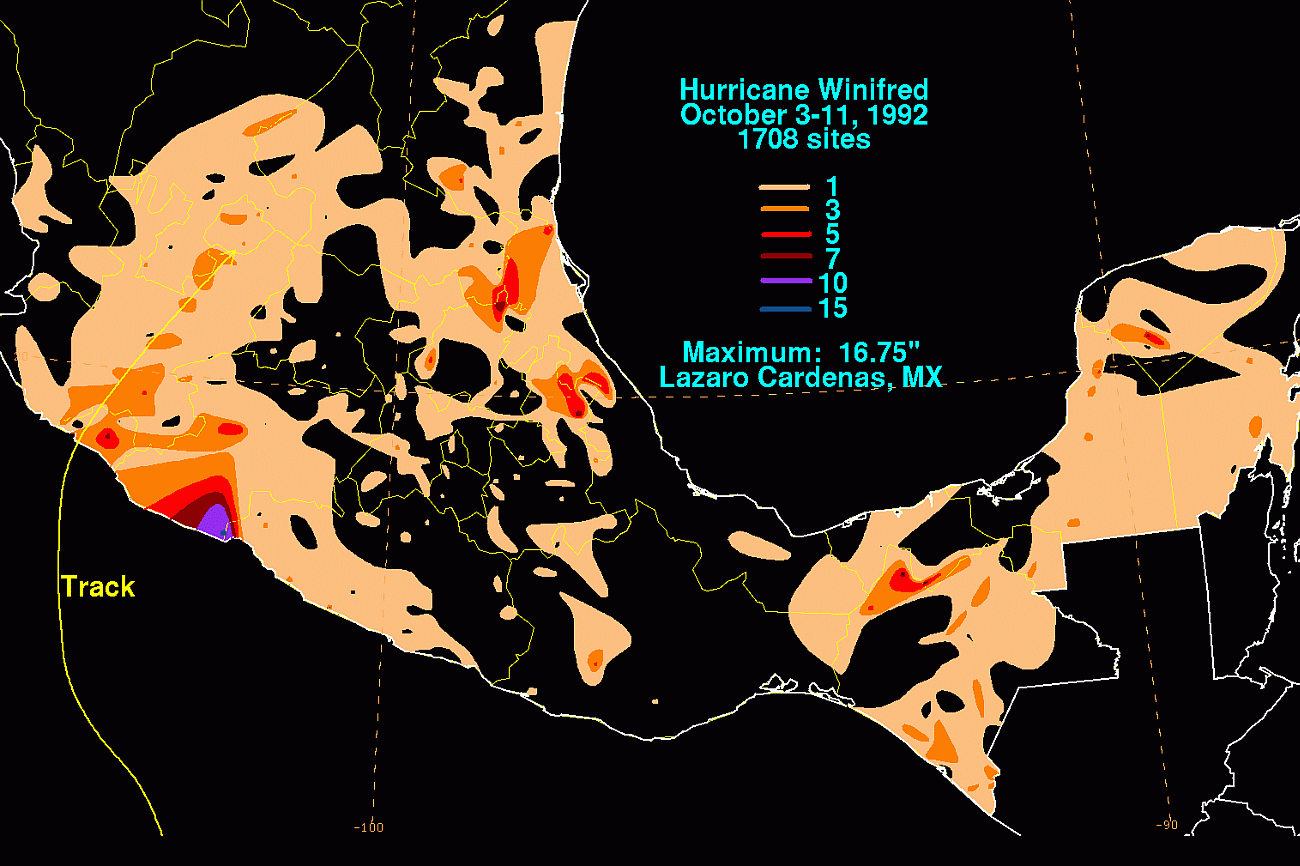
Rainfall summary for Hurricane Winifred

Starting on October 8, Hurricane Winifred caused rainfall over an extensive area of Mexico. The highest point maximum reported was of 16.7 in (420 mm) at Lázaro Cárdenas, a point to the right of its track. That rain caused flooding, which was blamed for three deaths.

Damage was heaviest in the states of Colima and Michoacán. In areas of the former, utilities were knocked out. Waves flooded portions of Highway 200 between Zihuatenajo, Ixtapa, and Lázaro Cárdenas. Other roads were also flooded. Waves of 12 ft (3.7 m) forced the closure of Playa de Oro International Airport and port facilities in Manzanillo. Throughout the affected area, trees were blown down on cars, roughly 1,500 houses were damaged, as were hotels and restaurants. About 84,000 ha (207,570 acres) of farmland were damaged, especially those of plantains and corn. Carlos de la Madrid Virgen, the Governor of Colima, estimated that the total damage in his state was 16 billion pesos (1992 MXP) or $5 million (1992 USD, $11.5 million 2026 USD). Elsewhere, Winifred forced a temporary closure of the port of Acapulco.

== See also ==
- Other storms of the same name
- List of Pacific hurricanes
