= List of storms named Winifred =

The name Winifred has been used for two tropical cyclones worldwide.

In the Eastern Pacific:

- Hurricane Winifred (1992) – made landfall southeast of Manzanillo, Colima, causing minor damage.

In the Australian Region:

- Cyclone Winifred (1986) – one of the most destructive cyclones to make landfall in northern Queensland on record.
