= List of storms named Wally =

The name Wally has been used for one tropical cyclone in the Australian region and one in the South Pacific Ocean.

In the Australian region:

- Cyclone Wally (1976) – a Category 3 severe tropical cyclone.

In the South Pacific Ocean:

- Cyclone Wally (1980) – a Category 1 tropical cyclone that made landfall in Fiji and caused 18 fatalities.

== See also ==
Similar names that have been used for tropical cyclones:

- Tropical Storm Wali (2014) – used in the Northeast Pacific Ocean.
- Tropical Storm Wallie (1965) – also used in the Northeast Pacific Ocean.
- List of storms named Willy – also used in the Australian region.
