= Typhoon Warren =

Pacific typhoon in 1988

Typhoon Warren (Huaning)
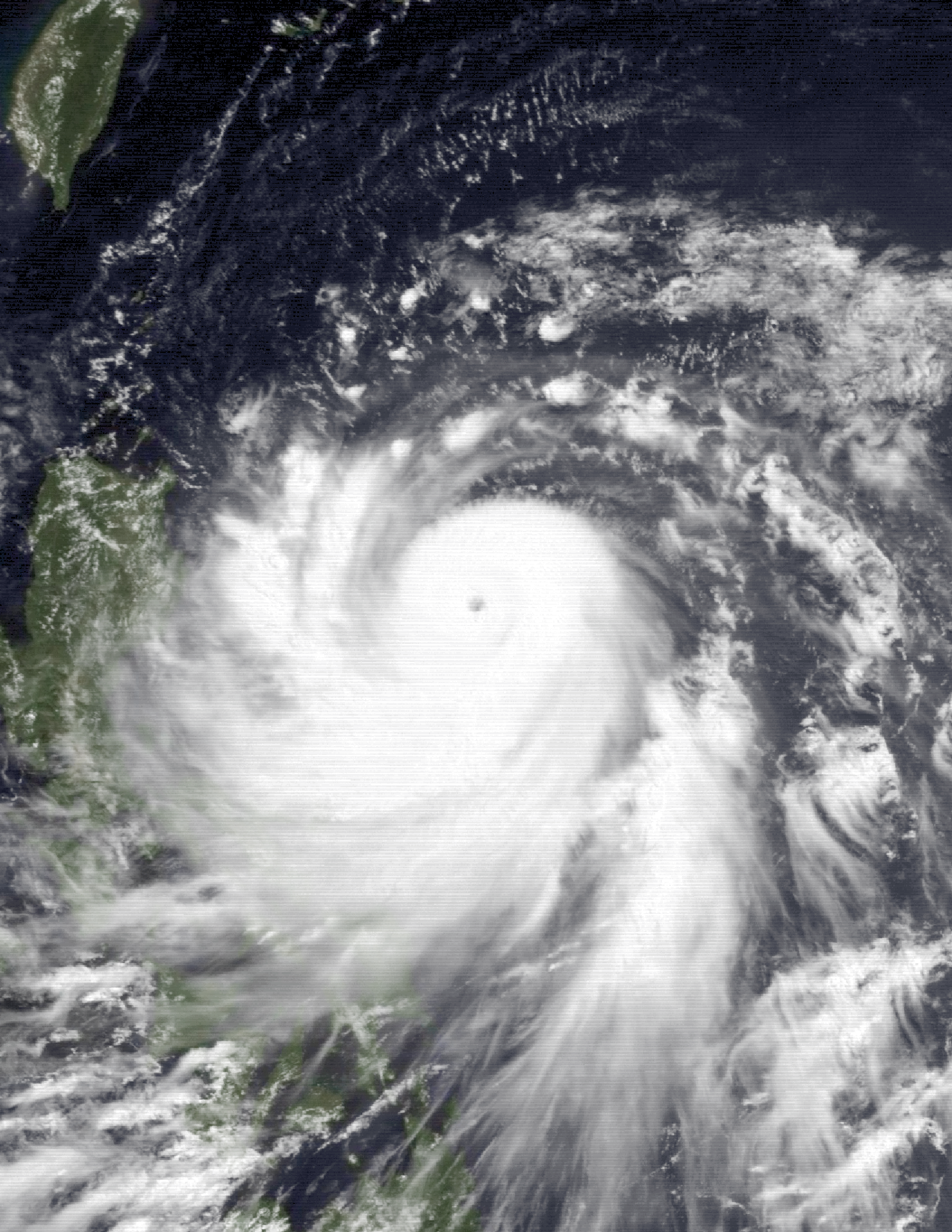
- Typhoon Warren near peak intensity on the morning of July 17

Meteorological history
- Formed: July 12, 1988
- Dissipated: July 20, 1988

Very strong typhoon
- 10-minute sustained (JMA)
- Highest winds: 165 km/h (105 mph)
- Lowest pressure: 940 hPa (mbar); 27.76 inHg

Category 4-equivalent typhoon
- 1-minute sustained (SSHWS/JTWC)
- Highest winds: 215 km/h (130 mph)
- Lowest pressure: 927 hPa (mbar); 27.37 inHg

Overall effects
- Fatalities: 23 total
- Damage: $281 million (1988 USD)
- Areas affected: Philippines, China
- Part of the 1988 Pacific typhoon season

Typhoon Warren, known in the Philippines as Typhoon Huaning, struck the Philippines and China during July 1988. An area of disturbed weather developed within the vicinity of the Caroline Islands during the second week of July. A tropical depression developed southeast of Guam on July 12, and on the next day, intensified into a tropical storm. Tracking generally west-northwest, Warren deepened into a typhoon on July 14. The storm subsequently entered a period of rapid intensification, commencing with Warren reaching its highest intensity on July 16. The following evening, the typhoon brushed Luzon, resulting in a weakening trend, although Warren was still a typhoon when it made landfall near Shantou. Warren rapidly dissipated inland.

Across the Philippines, 3,560 houses were damaged and 21,329 more were destroyed, displacing 19,224 families. Six people were killed and damage was estimated at US$11.4 million. In Hong Kong, severe flooding occurred, especially in low-lying areas, several trees were downed, and there were reports of five landslides. There, 13 people were injured. In Shantou, six people died, 106 were injured, 4,500 homes were destroyed and 38,000 were damaged. Throughout Guangdong Province, 150,000 homes were damaged and 13,000 were destroyed. Overall, 17 people died and 153 were wounded. Financial damage was estimated at $270 million. (Note: All Philippine currencies are converted to United States Dollars using Philippines Measuring worth with an exchange rate of the year 1988.)

== Meteorological history ==
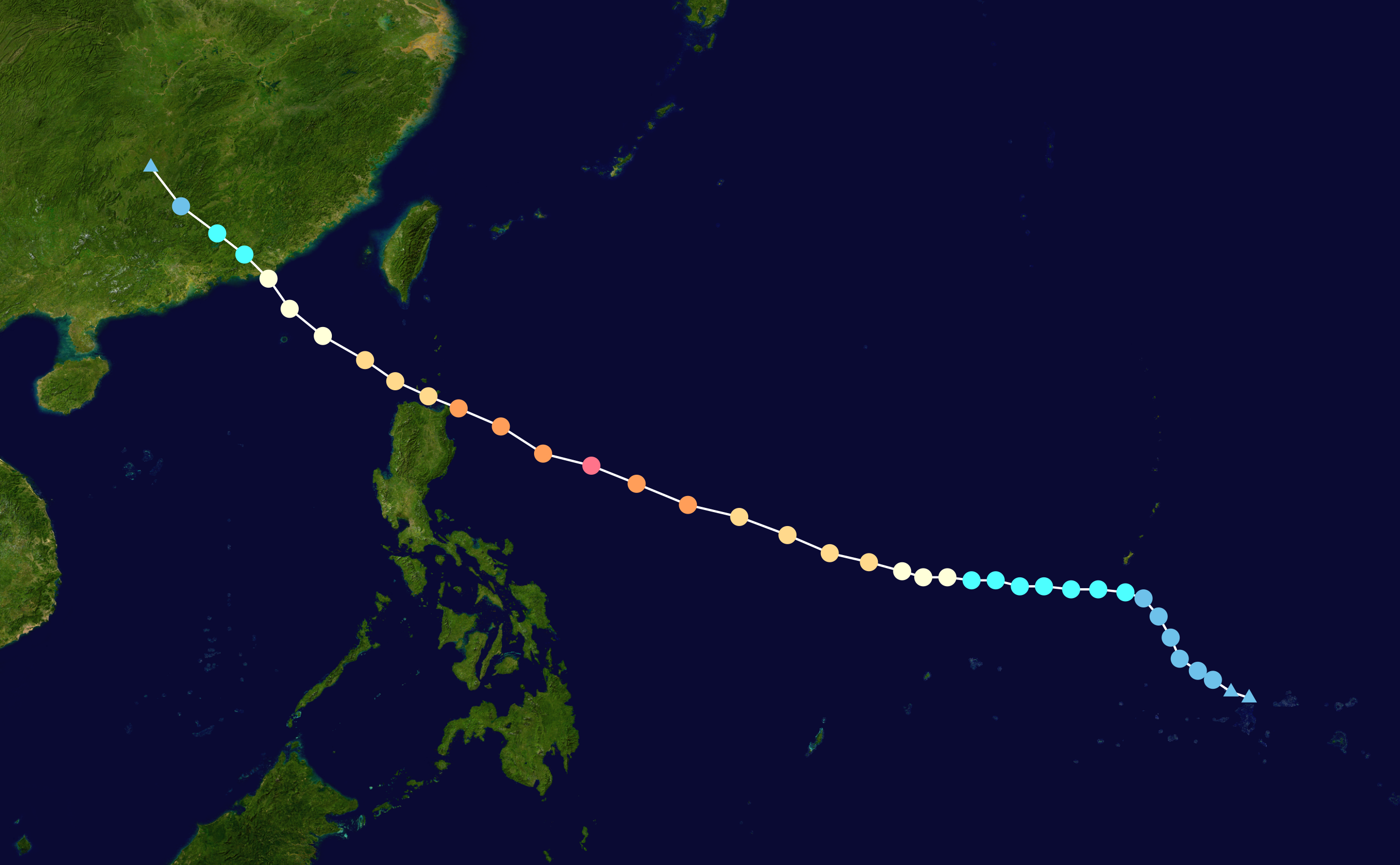
Map plotting the storm's track and intensity, according to the Saffir–Simpson scale Map key Saffir–Simpson scale Tropical depression (≤38 mph, ≤62 km/h) Tropical storm (39–73 mph, 63–118 km/h) Category 1 (74–95 mph, 119–153 km/h) Category 2 (96–110 mph, 154–177 km/h) Category 3 (111–129 mph, 178–208 km/h) Category 4 (130–156 mph, 209–251 km/h) Category 5 (≥157 mph, ≥252 km/h) Unknown Storm type Tropical cyclone Subtropical cyclone Extratropical cyclone, remnant low, tropical disturbance, or monsoon depression

Typhoon Warren developed from an area of disorganized convection in the eastern Caroline Islands that was first noted by the Joint Typhoon Warning Center (JTWC) on July 11. An increase in organization and improved upper-level outflow promoted the JTWC to raise its development chances. A Tropical Cyclone Formation Alert was issued for the system, which was located around 330 km (205 mi) southeast of Guam, at 05:30 UTC on July 12. Shortly thereafter, the Japan Meteorological Agency (JMA) declared the system a tropical depression (Note: The Japan Meteorological Agency is the official Regional Specialized Meteorological Center for the western Pacific Ocean.) (Note: Wind estimates from the JMA and most other basins throughout the world are sustained over 10 minutes, while estimates from the United States-based Joint Typhoon Warning Center are sustained over 1 minute. 10 minute winds are about 1.14 times the amount of 1 minute winds.) At noon, satellite images showed a central dense overcast and satellite intensity estimates supported winds of 55 km/h (35 mph). At 16:00 UTC on July 12, the JTWC classified the system as a tropical depression. Tracking westward, the depression passed within 100 km (60 mi) north of Guam. On the morning of July 13, the depression was upgraded into Tropical Storm Warren by the JTWC, although post-storm analysis revealed that the depression actually became a tropical storm late on July 12. At 00:00 UTC on July 14, the JMA declared the system a tropical storm, with the JTWC upgrading Warren to a typhoon that evening.

Tracking west-northwestward while also accelerating, Warren continued to gradually deepen. On the morning of July 15, the JMA designated Warren a severe tropical storm. At the time of the upgrade, Warren was located around 1,360 km (845 mi) east of Manila. Twenty-four hours later, the JMA upped Warren into a typhoon. Around this time, the storm entered a rapid intensification phase, with the JTWC estimating that Warren reached its peak intensity of 210 km/h (130 mph), equal to a low-end Category 4 hurricane on the Saffir-Simpson scale, on July 16. Around the same time, the JMA estimated that Warren achieved its peak intensity of 105 mph (170 km/h) and a minimum barometric pressure of 940 mbar (28 inHg).

While tracking across the Philippine Sea, many tropical cyclone forecast models showed Warren tracking northward near Taiwan and eventually recurving out to sea. Forecasters at the JTWC continued to predict a westward motion because satellite imagery and mid-level synoptic analysis showed a subtropical ridge to its north. According to the JTWC, the typhoon weakened slightly on July 17, though data from the JMA suggested that Warren maintained its maximum intensity until Warren skirted Luzon that evening. Land interaction resulted in some weakening, with the JTWC and JMA lowering the intensity of the typhoon to 175 km/h (110 mph) and 145 km/h (90 mph) at 00:00 UTC on July 18. After entering the South China Sea, Warren made landfall near the city of Shantou on the morning of July 19. At the time, the JTWC estimated winds of 135 km/h (85 mph) while the JMA reported winds of 120 km/h (75 mph). The storm rapidly weakened overland, and the storm dissipated on July 20 over the province of Guangdong.

== Preparations and impact ==
The inner core of the typhoon brushed the northern Philippines, prompting flooding that resulted in the suspension of classes. Around 60 people fled their homes in Baguio. Somewhere in the northern portion of the country, a man was killed when his motorcycle skidded on a slippery road as he went to inspect storm damage. Nationwide, the storm damaged 11,635 ha (28,750 acres) of rice and 28,530 ha (70,500 acres) of corn. Approximately 1,600 families lost access to drinking water. A total of 3,560 homes were damaged and an additional 21,329 were destroyed, which resulted in 102,169 people or 19,224 families that either sought shelter or were homeless. Six people were killed in the country. The storm inflicted US$11.4 million in damage to the country, including $10.1 million from infrastructure.

Further north, in Hong Kong, a No 1. hurricane signal was issued on July 18. Later that day, the signal was increased to a No. 3 signal, but on July 20, all signals were dropped. A minimum pressure of 995.3 mbar (29.39 inHg) was recorded at the Hong Kong Royal Observatory (HKO) on July 19, when the storm made its closest approach to Hong Kong. Tai Mo Shan recorded a peak wind speed of 87 km/h (54 mph). Meanwhile, Tate's Cairn observed a peak wind gust of 133 km/h (83 mph). North Point observed 302 mm (11.9 in) of rain over a five-day period, including 459 mm (18.1 in) in a 24-hour period. In Hong Kong, severe flooding occurred, especially in low-lying areas, several trees were downed, and five minor landslides were reported. Many village houses were submerged. In Sheung Shui, more than 20 people were stranded. About 100 ha (250 acres) of ponds were flooded and 220 t (245 short tons) of fish were lost, worth $760,000. In addition, 270 ha (670 acres) of agricultural land were also flooded, resulting in the drownings of 1,370 pigs and 133,000 poultry. Along the Tuen Mun Highway, a 15 m (50 ft) tree collapsed, damaging a van and injuring two men. Seventeen flights were called off at the airport and ferry services to Tap Mun, Macau, and mainland China were suspended. Throughout Hong Kong, 12 people were injured and a 5-year-old boy was reported missing after falling into the sea at a local park.

Throughout Shantou, six people were killed and 106 people were injured. There, 50,000 t (55,000 short tons) of food were lost. About 4,500 houses and 14,000 huts collapsed, and 38,000 houses sustained damage. About 178,000 ha (439,850 acres) of agricultural area were destroyed, of which 68,000 ha (168,030 acres) were paddy fields. In addition, seven ships sunk and another 178 were damaged. Twenty-seven electricity sub-stations were destroyed and five hydroelectric power stations were damaged. In Jieyang, 749 power lines were downed. In Qiqihar, 14,000 structures were destroyed. The city of Canton, to the southwest of Shantou, was spared by the typhoon. Across Guangdong Province, power and phone service was knocked out for 24 hours. Province-wide, 13,000 homes were demolished, with 150,000 others damaged. A total of 270 bridges in addition to 620 mi (1,000 km) of telephone lines and roughly 770 kilometres (480 mi) of roads were destroyed. Close to 1,000,000 t (1,100,000 short tons) of crops were flooded. According to press reports, 17 people were killed and 153 injured. Damage was estimated at $270 million, including $9.5 million from rice fields and $6 million from fruit trees.

== See also ==
- Tropical Storm Warren (1984)
