= List of storms named Wukong =

The name Wukong (Mandarin: 悟空, [u˥˩ kʰʊŋ˥]) has been used for five tropical cyclones in the western North Pacific Ocean. The name was contributed by China and refers to Sun Wukong, a character in the Chinese epic Journey to the West, in Mandarin.

- Typhoon Wukong (2000) (T0016, 23W, Maring) – affected Hainan and Indochina.
- Severe Tropical Storm Wukong (2006) (T0610, 11W) – impacted southern Japan.
- Tropical Storm Wukong (2012) (T1225, 27W, Quinta) – impacted the Philippines, causing flash flooding.
- Severe Tropical Storm Wukong (2018) (T1811, 14W) – churned in the open ocean.
- Tropical Storm Wukong (2024) (T2408, 09W) – churned in the open ocean.

| Preceded by Ampil | Pacific typhoon season names Wukong | Succeeded by Jongdari |
