= List of storms named Wilma =

The name Wilma has been used for six tropical cyclones worldwide: one in the Atlantic Ocean, three in the West Pacific Ocean (including two in the Philippine Area of Responsibility), one in the Australian region, and one in the South Pacific Ocean.

In the Atlantic:

- Hurricane Wilma (2005) – a Category 5 hurricane that became the strongest Atlantic hurricane on record in terms of barometric pressure.

The name Wilma was retired after the 2005 season, being replaced with Whitney.

In the West Pacific:

- Typhoon Wilma (1952) (T5219) – a Category 5-equivalent super typhoon that made landfall in the Philippines and Vietnam.
- Tropical Depression Wilma (2013) (30W) – made landfall in the Philippines only three days before Typhoon Haiyan. Later contributed to the formation of Depression BOB 05 in the North Indian Ocean.
- Tropical Depression Wilma (2025) – made landfall in the Philippines.

In the Australian region:

- Cyclone Wilma (1975) – a Category 2 tropical cyclone.

In the South Pacific:

- Cyclone Wilma (2011) – a Category 4 severe tropical cyclone that became the first storm to affect New Zealand as a tropical cyclone.

The name Wilma was retired after the 2010–11 season, being replaced with Wano.

Preceded by Verbena	Pacific typhoon season names Wilma	Succeeded by Yasmin
