= List of storms named Washi =

The name Washi (Japanese: ワシ, [β̞a̠ɕi]) has been used for two tropical cyclones in the Western Pacific Ocean. The name was contributed by Japan and refers to the constellation Aquila, the eagle, in Japanese.

- Tropical Storm Washi (2005) (T0508, 08W) – impacted South China
- Tropical Storm Washi (2011; T1121, 27W, Sendong) – impacted southern Philippines and killed more than 1,200 people

The name Washi was retired following the 2011 Pacific typhoon season and was replaced with Hato, which refers to the constellation Columba, the dove, in Japanese.

== See also ==
- Cyclone Wasi (2020) – a South Pacific tropical cyclone with a similar name
