= List of storms named Willy =

The names Willy and Willie have been used for four tropical cyclones. Three of them occurred in the Australian region, and the fourth occurred in the West Pacific Ocean.

In the West Pacific Ocean:

- Tropical Storm Willie (1996) (T9621, 27W) – a severe tropical storm that made landfall in Vietnam and caused 38 fatalities.

In the Australian region:

- Cyclone Willy (1984) – a Category 3 severe tropical cyclone.
- Cyclone Willy (1994) – a Category 2 tropical cyclone that affected the Cocos Islands.
- Cyclone Willy (2005) – a Category 3 severe tropical cyclone that did not affect land.

== See also ==
Similar names that have been used for tropical cyclones:

- List of storms named Billy – also used in the Australian region.
- List of storms named Wally – used in the Australian region and in the South Pacific Ocean.
- List of storms named William – used in the South Pacific Ocean.
