= List of storms named Walding =

The name Walding has been used to name five tropical cyclones in the Philippines by PAGASA in the Western Pacific.

- Typhoon Trix (1965) (T6524, 29W, Walding) – caused heavy rains in Japan, 98 people were killed and 9 were missing due to the resulting flooding and landslides.
- Typhoon Lucy (1977) (T7720, 20W, Walding) – a powerful category 4 typhoon that changed course before reaching the coast of the Philippines.
- Typhoon Gay (1981) (T8124, 24W, Walding) – a category 2 typhoon that passed off the coast of Japan.
- Typhoon Irma (1989) (T8931, 34W, Walding) – an intense typhoon in the Philippine Sea.
- Typhoon Abe (1993) (T9315, 21W, Walding) – a Category 3 typhoon that made landfall in southern China.
