= List of storms named Warling =

The name Warling has been used to name four tropical cyclones in the Philippines by PAGASA (and its predecessor, the Philippine Weather Bureau) in the Western North Pacific Ocean.

- Typhoon Agnes (1971) (T7126, 29W, Warling) – a minimal but slightly erratic typhoon that made landfall in Taiwan.
- Typhoon Tip (1979) (T7921, 23W, Warling) – the most intense and tropical cyclone ever recorded, with a minimum pressure of 870 mb. Tip also remains the largest tropical cyclone worldwide, with a wind diameter up to 1,380 miles (2,220 km) across. Tip weakened to a Category 1 typhoon before making landfall in Japan, killing nearly 100 people.
- Typhoon Orchid (1983) (T8320, 20W, Warling) – directly killed 3 people in the Philippines and capsized a vessel, killing 167 more people.
- Typhoon Seth (1991) (T9124, 26W, Warling) – a strong and long-lived typhoon which gradually weakened as it approached the northern part of the Philippines.
