= Typhoon Winnie =

Pacific typhoon in 1997

Typhoon Winnie (Ibiang)
- Typhoon Winnie at peak intensity on August 12

Meteorological history
- Formed: August 5, 1997
- Extratropical: August 20, 1997
- Dissipated: August 23, 1997

Very strong typhoon
- 10-minute sustained (JMA)
- Highest winds: 185 km/h (115 mph)
- Lowest pressure: 915 hPa (mbar); 27.02 inHg

Category 5-equivalent super typhoon
- 1-minute sustained (SSHWS/JTWC)
- Highest winds: 260 km/h (160 mph)
- Lowest pressure: 898 hPa (mbar); 26.52 inHg

Overall effects
- Fatalities: 372 total
- Damage: $3.2 billion (1997 USD)
- Areas affected: Northern Mariana Islands, Philippines, Taiwan, Japan, China, Korean Peninsula, Russian Far East
- IBTrACS
- Part of the 1997 Pacific typhoon season

Typhoon Winnie, known in the Philippines as Super Typhoon Ibiang, was the most destructive tropical cyclone to impact the Chinese provinces of Zhejiang, Fujian, Jiangsu, and Shandong in 200 years. Originating from an area of low pressure over the Pacific Ocean on August 5, 1997, the system organized into a tropical depression. It headed northwestward, slowly strengthening into a tropical storm on August 9. Intensification became more rapid as conditions became more favorable, and Winnie reached typhoon strength on August 10. On August 12, 1997, Winnie became a Category 5-equivalent super typhoon, with peak 1-minute sustained winds of 160 miles per hour (260 km/h). Winnie then weakened and passed north of Taiwan, before making landfall in Eastern China at Category 1-equivalent typhoon strength on the August 18. Winnie continued northeast over land while weakening, bringing heavy rainfall before dissipating on August 23.

Winnie is also tied with Typhoon Carmen in 1960 for having the largest eye on record, at 230 mi (370 km) in diameter.

== Meteorological history ==
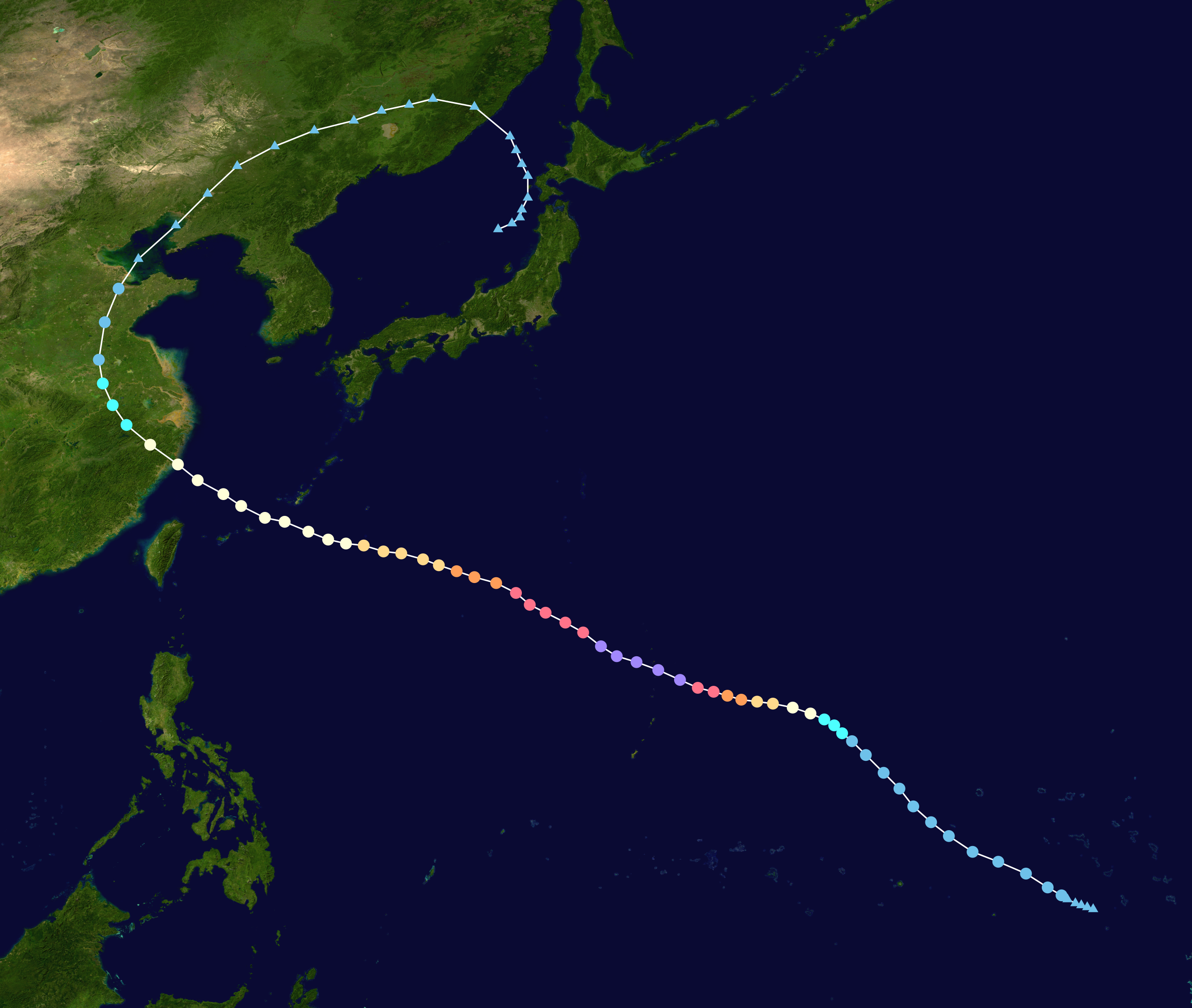
Map plotting the storm's track and intensity, according to the Saffir–Simpson scale Map key Saffir–Simpson scale Tropical depression (≤38 mph, ≤62 km/h) Tropical storm (39–73 mph, 63–118 km/h) Category 1 (74–95 mph, 119–153 km/h) Category 2 (96–110 mph, 154–177 km/h) Category 3 (111–129 mph, 178–208 km/h) Category 4 (130–156 mph, 209–251 km/h) Category 5 (≥157 mph, ≥252 km/h) Unknown Storm type Tropical cyclone Subtropical cyclone Extratropical cyclone, remnant low, tropical disturbance, or monsoon depression

On August 5, an area of low-pressure formed near the Marshall Islands. The low headed northwestward while gradually organizing, strengthening into a tropical depression on the next day, with the JTWC assigning the storm the identifier 14W. Tropical Depression 14W subsequently strengthened into Tropical Storm Winnie on August 9. Intensification became more rapid as conditions became more favorable, and Winnie reached typhoon strength on August 10. Two days later, Winnie became the 4th Super Typhoon of the season, with peak 1-minute sustained winds of 160 mph. Soon afterward, the eye became ragged and large, with an outer eyewall spanning 230 miles (320 km) in diameter. On August 18, Typhoon Winnie passed north of Taiwan and made landfall in eastern China, where it winded down until it degenerated into a remnant low on August 20. Winnie's remnant continued northeastward, bringing heavy rain and damage across China, before dissipating on August 23.

=== Records ===
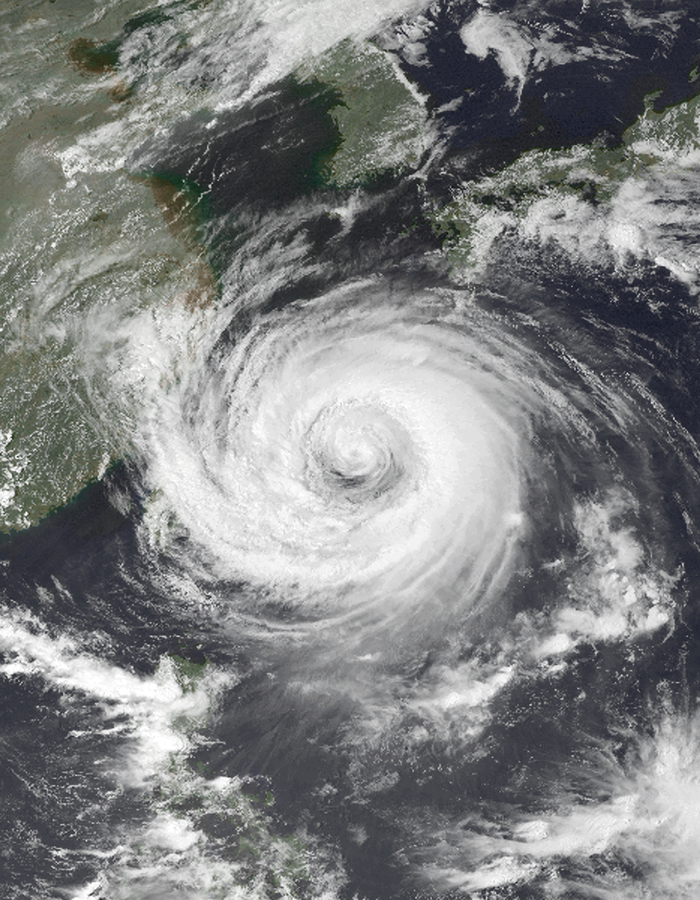
Typhoon Winnie on August 17, having the largest eye of a tropical cyclone ever recorded, tied with Typhoon Carmen of 1960.

Typhoon Winnie is tied with Typhoon Carmen in 1960 for having the largest eye on record, at 200 nautical miles (230 mi; 370 km) in diameter. This gigantic eye contributed to Winnie's unusually large storm surge in Shanghai, even though the storm made landfall well to the south of the city.

== Impact ==
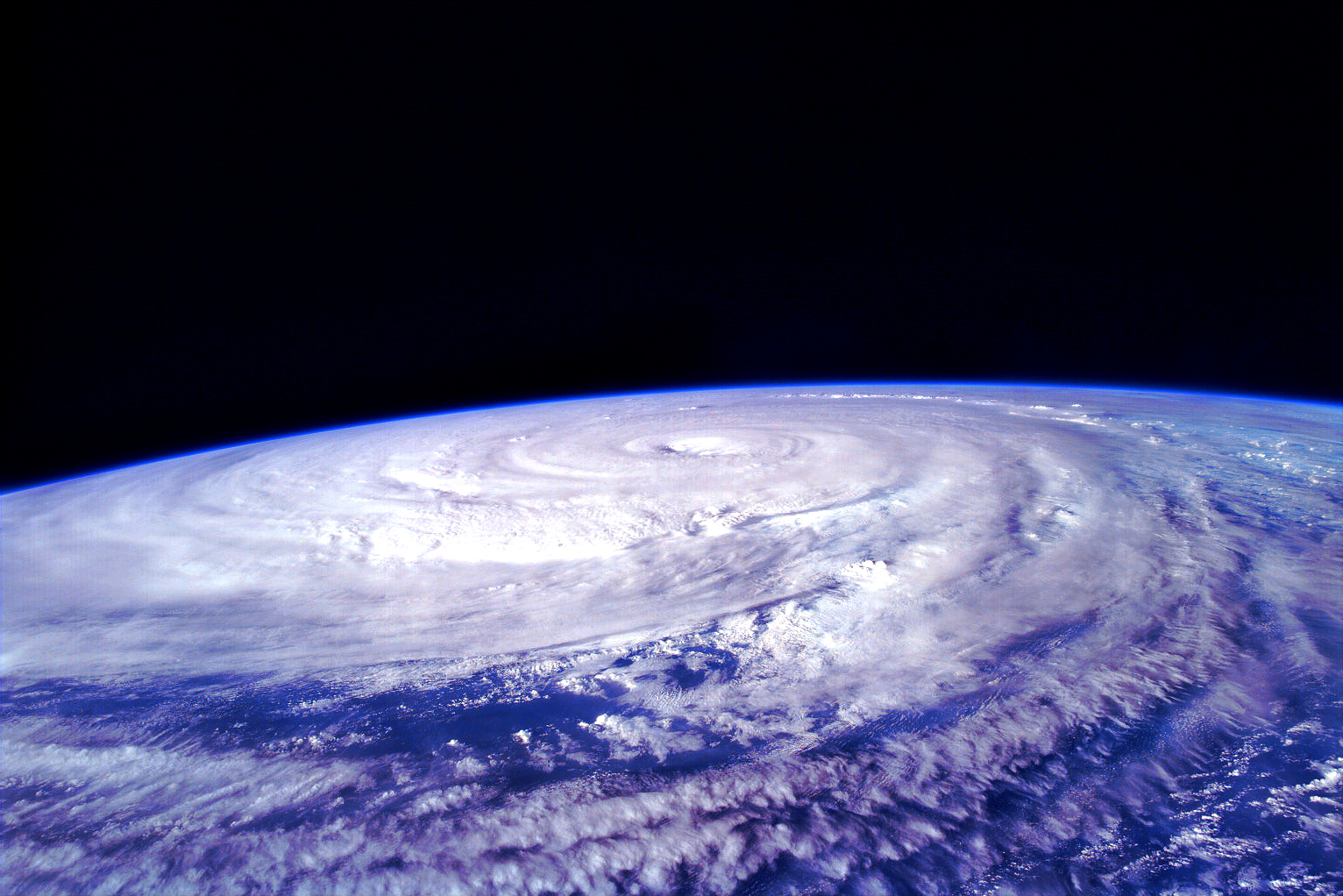
Photograph of Typhoon Winnie on August 13 taken by a crew member of STS-85

=== Philippines ===
In combination with the seasonal monsoon, rainfall from Typhoon Winnie killed at least 27 people in the northern Philippines on August 18. A total of 810,105 people were affected by the storm in the country, of which 53,654 were evacuated. A total of 204 homes were destroyed and 5,885 others were damaged. Preliminary damage was estimated at 60.188 million pesos (US$2.2 million).

=== Japan ===
Throughout the Ryukyu Islands and Kyūshū, Typhoon Winnie produced torrential rainfall, peaking at 450 mm (18 in) in Mikado, Miyazaki.

=== Taiwan ===
Across Taiwan, Typhoon Winnie produced enormous amounts of rainfall, with some areas recording over 710 mm (28 in) over a 13-hour span. At least 46 people were killed by the storm throughout the island, 28 of whom were crushed when the Lincoln Mansions apartment building buckled and collapsed after the hillside it was on gave way near the town of Xizhi. Nine other people were trapped underneath the rubble and likely perished. Near Taipei, six people were killed in a landslide, including two children. Three more drowned amidst flood waters near the city; another died after being blown off a roof while trying to break into a home; and a sixth died from unknown causes. Flooding in suburban Taipei left the entire ground level of buildings underwater, sending debris across streets turned into rivers. Large swells produced by the storm also eroded coastal highways along the eastern shores. Additionally, an estimated 68,000 people lost power in northern Taiwan. Overall, damage from Winnie was estimated at $10 million across the island.

=== People's Republic of China ===
In the People's Republic of China, Typhoon Winnie was regarded as one of the worst storms to strike the country in over a decade. At least 310 people were confirmed to have been killed and damage exceeded $3.2 billion (1997 USD). Additionally, over 3,000 people were injured by the typhoon.

Prior to the typhoon's arrival in mainland China, officials evacuated an estimated 1 million people from coastal areas. Along coastal Zhejiang, large swells produced by Winnie breached dikes at several towns, prompting the evacuation of 30,000 people. Across the province, heavy rains flooded at least 20,000 homes and killed at least 241 people. Thousands of homes were destroyed by the storm, which accounted for a majority of the fatalities. In Shanghai, the Huangpu River broke its banks and inundated 400 homes with 1.5 m (4.9 ft) of water and knocked out power to thousands of residents. An estimated 1.45 million people were isolated during the storm after thousands of towns were surrounded by flood waters. In Zhenjiang province alone, damage was estimated at 8.3 billion yuan (US$1 billion). Additionally, roughly 1.6 million acres of farmland was damaged, leaving $2.2 billion in losses. In nearby Jiangsu and Anhui provinces, 69 people were killed by the storm.

== Aftermath ==
=== Taiwan and the Philippines ===
In the wake of the typhoon, rescue crews were deployed throughout Taiwan, especially to the hard-hit areas around Taipei. At the site of the apartment collapse, rescue attempts were taken out for three days and after finding no additional survivors on the third, the remaining nine trapped within the rubble were presumed dead.

In response to the widespread damage and flooding in the Philippines, the National Disaster Coordinating Council deployed disaster teams on August 20 to the affected regions to evacuate residents and begin relief efforts. The Philippine National Red Cross reported that it had enough food in store to serve 4,106 families in the wake of the storm.

=== People's Republic of China ===
According to news reports in China, emergency crews were out and repairing dikes damaged or destroyed by the typhoon as early as August 20. Within a few days of the storm's passage, food supplies and transportation had returned to normal in most of the affected areas. Roughly 300 km (190 mi) of failed dikes in Zhenjiang were considered to be the main reason why the storm was unusually deadly and destructive. By August 23, residents began repairing their homes in parts of the province after having evacuated ahead of the storm.

== See also ==
- List of tropical cyclone records
- Other storms with the same name
- Typhoon Andy (1982)
- Typhoon Soudelor (2015) - A category 5-equivalent typhoon that took a similar track
- Typhoon Bavi (2026) - Another category 5-equivalent typhoon that impacted similar areas 29 years later
