= List of storms named Wynne =

The name Wynne was used for three tropical cyclones in the Northwestern Pacific Ocean:

- Typhoon Wynne (1980) (T8018, 24W, Welpring) – strongest typhoon of the season, passed through Ryukyu Islands twice.
- Tropical Storm Wynne (1984) (T8402, 02W, Asiang) – passed between Taiwan and Luzon before striking China, killed three fishermen on Luzon.
- Typhoon Wynne (1987) (T8707, 07W, Gening) – typhoon that weakened while passing east of Japan.
