= List of storms named Ward =

The name Ward has been used for three tropical cyclones worldwide, one in the North Indian Ocean and two in the Western Pacific Ocean.

In the Western Pacific:

- Typhoon Ward (1992) – a category 2 typhoon that stayed out to sea.
- Typhoon Ward (1995) – a category 5 typhoon that also stayed out to sea.

In the North Indian Ocean:

- Cyclone Ward (2009) – made landfall in Sri Lanka.
