= List of storms named Wilda =

The name Wilda has been used for ten tropical cyclones in the West Pacific Ocean:

- Typhoon Wilda (1955) (T5503) – a Category 2-equivalent typhoon.
- Tropical Storm Wilda (1959) (T5904) – made landfall in China, Korea, and Russia.
- Tropical Storm Wilda (1961) (T6125, 58W) – made landfall in Vietnam, causing flood levels along the Mekong River to reach their highest levels since 1937.
- Typhoon Wilda (1964) (ja) (T6420, 32W) – a Category 5-equivalent super typhoon that became one of the strongest typhoons by atmospheric pressure to make landfall in Japan, causing over 40 fatalities.
- Tropical Storm Wilda (1967) (T6705, 05W)
- Typhoon Wilda (1970) (ja) (T7009, 10W, Iliang) – a Category 3-equivalent typhoon that made landfall in Japan, causing 11 fatalities.
- Tropical Storm Wilda (1973) (T7301, 01W, Atring) – a severe tropical storm that made landfall in the Philippines and in China.
- Tropical Storm Wilda (1976) (T7611, 11W) – a severe tropical storm that affected Japan.
- Tropical Storm Wilda (1991) (T9127, 29W) – affected the Philippines.
- Typhoon Wilda (1994) (T9432, 35W) – a Category 4-equivalent typhoon.
