= Tropical Storm Winona (1990) =

Pacific tropical storm in 1990

- Winona at peak intensity on August 9

Meteorological history
- Formed: August 4, 1990
- Extratropical: August 11, 1990
- Dissipated: August 14, 1990

Severe tropical storm
- 10-minute sustained (JMA)
- Highest winds: 110 km/h (70 mph)
- Lowest pressure: 975 hPa (mbar); 28.79 inHg

Category 1-equivalent typhoon
- 1-minute sustained (SSHWS/JTWC)
- Highest winds: 120 km/h (75 mph)
- Lowest pressure: 976 hPa (mbar); 28.82 inHg

Overall effects
- Fatalities: 1 reported
- Damage: $60.3 million (1990 USD)
- Areas affected: Japan
- IBTrACS
- Part of the 1990 Pacific typhoon season

Tropical Storm Winona or Typhoon Winona struck Japan during August 1990. An area of disturbed weather developed within the monsoon trough, located over the East China Sea, on August 4. Despite the presence of strong wind shear, a tropical depression developed later that day. The depression initially tracked northeast, bypassing the southern tip of Kyushu. Thereafter, the depression turned southeast, and on August 6, was believed to have obtained tropical storm intensity. In response to a building subtropical ridge to its southeast, Winona veered north while gradually intensifying. On August 9, Winona peaked in intensity, and while near peak intensity, made landfall in Shizuoka Prefecture early the following morning. Winona transitioned into an extratropical cyclone on August 11, and was last observed on August 14.

The tropical storm lashed the Japanese archipelago with heavy rains, strong winds, and waves up to 7.9 m (26 ft) high. More than 60 scheduled domestic air flights between Tokyo and western Japan were delayed or cancelled. Inter-island ferry service was suspended due to the storm. A total of 110 trains were cancelled or delayed, which led to 250,000 stranded passengers. Thirteen people suffered injuries, including three seriously. Seven reservoirs in Tokyo received more than 20,000,000 short tons (18,143,695 t) of water, which allowed authorities to lift restrictions on water use. Nearby, in Shizuoka Prefecture, 55 dwellings were flooded, resulting in 211 people homeless. Nationwide, over 400 roads were damaged and 43 landslides were reported. A total of 686 houses sustained flooding. In all, one fatality was attributed to the storm and damage was estimated at 8.74 billion yen or $60.3 million (1991 USD).

== Meteorological history ==
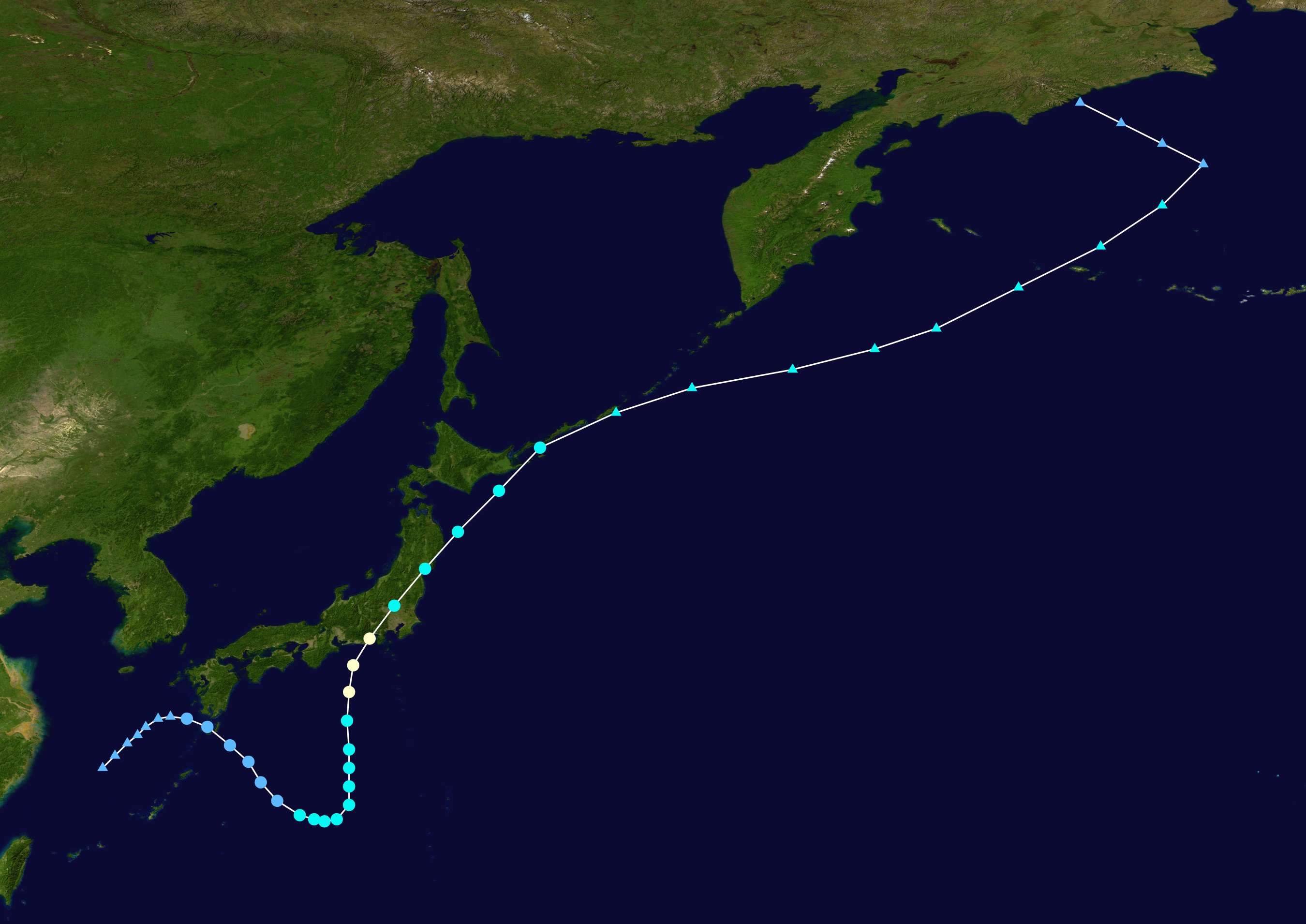
Map plotting the storm's track and intensity, according to the Saffir–Simpson scale Map key Saffir–Simpson scale Tropical depression (≤38 mph, ≤62 km/h) Tropical storm (39–73 mph, 63–118 km/h) Category 1 (74–95 mph, 119–153 km/h) Category 2 (96–110 mph, 154–177 km/h) Category 3 (111–129 mph, 178–208 km/h) Category 4 (130–156 mph, 209–251 km/h) Category 5 (≥157 mph, ≥252 km/h) Unknown Storm type Tropical cyclone Subtropical cyclone Extratropical cyclone, remnant low, tropical disturbance, or monsoon depression

Tropical Storm Winona originated from a monsoon trough that was displaced 550 km (340 mi) north of its climatological position. An area of enhanced convection developed within the monsoon trough in the East China Sea around 00:00 UTC on August 4. Six hours later, the Joint Typhoon Warning Center (JTWC) started tracking the system as a weak low-pressure area developed. At 18:00 UTC, the Japan Meteorological Agency (JMA) classified the system as a tropical depression. (Note: The Japan Meteorological Agency is the official Regional Specialized Meteorological Center for the western Pacific Ocean.) (Note: Wind estimates from the JMA and most other basins throughout the world are sustained over 10 minutes, while estimates from the United States-based Joint Typhoon Warning Center are sustained over 1 minute. 10-minute winds are about 1.14 times the amount of 1-minute winds.) Initially, strong wind shear left the center to the north of persistent convection. Following a Dvorak classification of T1.0/50 km/h (30 mph), the JTWC issued a Tropical Cyclone Formation Alert (TCFA) at 11:00 UTC on August 5. Twenty four hours later, the JTWC started issuing warnings on the system, designating the system as a tropical depression, after the system's convection structure improved and thunderstorm activity increased in coverage. The depression initially moved northeast, skirting past the southern tip of Kyushu, only to turn southeast under the influence of the monsoonal flow. On the evening of August 6, the JMA upgraded the depression into a tropical storm.

Winona was in between two subtropical ridges – one in the Luzon Strait and one south of Tropical Storm Vernon. Early on August 7, the JTWC upgraded the system into a tropical storm, naming it Winona. Wind shear began to relax; consequently, the storm's low-level center moved under the deep convection. By 00:00 UTC on August 8, Winona abruptly turned north in response to a building ridge to its southeast. Strengthening was aided by the development of dual upper-level outflow channels. Early on August 8, the JMA reported that Winona strengthened into a severe tropical storm. By this time, Winona was expected by both agencies to move over northeastern Japan, but Winona tracked further south than predicted, maintaining a northward course in the direction of Japan. At noon on August 9, the JMA estimated that Winona peaked in intensity with winds of 115 km/h (70 mph) and a barometric pressure of 975 mbar (28.8 inHg). Meanwhile, the JTWC upgraded Winona into a typhoon; simultaneously, the agency estimated that the typhoon reached peak intensity, with winds of 120 km/h (75 mph) over 330 km (205 mi) east-southeast of Tokyo. Early on August 10, Winona made landfall close to Hamamatsu near peak intensity. After landfall, it began to accelerate northeastward and by 12:00 UTC, Winona was embedded in the mid-latitude westerlies and started a transition into an extratropical cyclone. Eighteen hours later, at 06:00 UTC on August 11, the JMA declared Winona an extratropical cyclone; the JTWC followed suit several hours later. On August 14, the JMA ceased tracking the system.

== Impact ==
Tropical Storm Winona brought strong winds and heavy rains to the Japanese archipelago. A peak rainfall total of 545 mm (21.5 in) occurred in Hakone, with 538 mm (21.2 in) falling in a day. Meanwhile, a peak hourly total of 70 mm (2.8 in) fell in Harunasan. A wind gust of 45 km/h (28 mph) was recorded on Mount Tsukubasan. Offshore, waves up to 26 ft (7.9 m) high were recorded.

Due to stormy weather, more than 60 scheduled domestic flights between Tokyo and western Japan were delayed or cancelled. Inter-island ferry service was suspended. A total of 50 trains were cancelled and 60 others were delayed, which resulted in 250,000 stranded passengers. Thirteen people suffered injuries, including three seriously. More than 400 roads were damaged and 43 landslides were reported. A total of 686 houses sustained flooding. One person was killed and damage totaled 8.74 billion yen ($60.3 million USD). (Note: All currencies are converted from Japanese yen to United States Dollars using this with an exchange rate of the year 1990.) (Note: All damage totals are in 1990 values of their respective currencies.)

In Akita Prefecture, authorities reported that twelve houses were damaged in Akita City while eight homes were damaged in Yokote, and there were two landslides. Passing over Shizuoka Prefecture with most of its former intensity, 8 roads were closed and 28 homes were damaged. A total of 77 ha (190 acres) of rice as well as 212 ha (520 acres) of vegetables were damaged, along with three agricultural facilities. Damage was estimated at 243.1 million yen ($1.68 million USD), but the extent was limited by the storm's fast forward motion. A 54-year-old hotel owner broke a rib when gusty winds toppled a seaside structure in Shizuoka. In Fukushima Prefecture, seven homes were damaged in four towns, thirty-nine roads were closed, of which two were national highways. A total of 1,350 households lost power, and power lines downed several trees. The towns of Nakakura and Yazukado suffered flooding. One person was killed in Toyama Prefecture. A landslide closed two roads in Kmoagane in Nagano Prefecture. Throughout the prefecture, 18 dwellings sustained damage and 68 trains were cancelled or delayed, resulting in 49,000 stranded travelers. In Tochigi Prefecture, 141 houses, 266 roads, 284 communication lines, and 6 bridges received damage, while 10 homes were damaged and 23 landslides occurred. River embankments were breached in 710 locations while 221 ha (550 acres) of arable land was damaged, totaling 89.5 million yen ($617,000 USD). Damage there totaled to 1.32 billion yen ($9.1 million USD) and one person was hurt. In Gunma Prefecture, 26 structures, 35 roads, and 573 ha (1,420 acres) of farmland were damaged. Prefecturewide, Winona inflicted 390.8 million yen ($2.7 million USD) in damage. Along coastal areas of Saitama Prefecture, 60 houses were damaged, 158 ha (390 acres) of crops were damaged, 30 traffic accidents occurred, and five landslides were reported. In Ibaraki Prefecture, the storm dropped heavy rainfall, which resulted in four downed power lines, while one individual was injured. Damage in Yamanashi Prefecture totaled 6.62 billion yen ($45.7 million USD), including 4.80 billion yen ($33.1 million USD) in property damage. To the southeast of Tokyo, in Chiba Prefecture, 35 dwellings were damaged, and damage amounted to 3 million yen ($20,000 USD). Two people were hurt, a 56-year-old fractured his leg and a 78-year-old female fell due to strong winds, six embankments were breached, and thirty-two roads sustained damage. In Shizuoka Prefecture, the prefecture where the storm moved onshore, the heavy rainfall damaged 541 homes, destroyed 55 others, and triggered 13 landslides, which resulted in 12 damaged roads and 21 people homeless. The capital city of Tokyo was lashed with strong winds and heavy rain for several hours, with damage estimated at 34.9 million yen ($241,000 USD). Seven reservoirs in Tokyo received more than 20,000,000 short tons (18,143,695 t) of water; the reservoirs reached 36% capacity, which prompted officials to lift restrictions on water use that were enacted following a drought. Ten homes were flooded and damage totaled 128.5 million yen ($886,000 USD) in Kanagawa Prefecture. Seven people were wounded, mostly due to gusty winds. The cyclone forced the first two days of the Karuizawa 72 Tokyu Ladies Open to be shortened.

== See also ==
- Typhoon Thad (1981)
