= Typhoon Wayne (1983) =

Pacific typhoon in 1983

Typhoon Wayne (Katring)
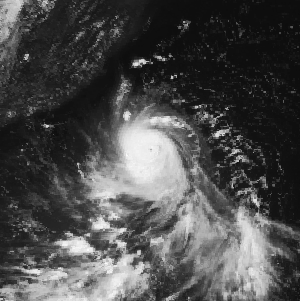
- Typhoon Wayne on July 24

Meteorological history
- Formed: July 21, 1983
- Dissipated: July 26, 1983

Violent typhoon
- 10-minute sustained (JMA)
- Highest winds: 205 km/h (125 mph)
- Lowest pressure: 925 hPa (mbar); 27.32 inHg

Category 4-equivalent super typhoon
- 1-minute sustained (SSHWS/JTWC)
- Highest winds: 250 km/h (155 mph)
- Lowest pressure: 920 hPa (mbar); 27.17 inHg

Overall effects
- Fatalities: 147 total
- Areas affected: Philippines, Taiwan, China
- IBTrACS
- Part of the 1983 Pacific typhoon season

Typhoon Wayne, known in the Philippines as Typhoon Katring, was an intense tropical cyclone that brought significant flooding to the Philippines in July 1983. The typhoon originated from an area of disturbed weather that formed far from land towards the end of July. Late on July 22, Wayne developed gale-force winds while moving west. The next day, it was estimated to have become a typhoon, and Wayne subsequently entered a period of rapid deepening. During the morning hours of July 24, the typhoon was estimated to have reached its peak intensity of 205 km/h (125 mph), but soon began to weaken due to interaction with land. By the time it moved ashore in southern China on July 25, Wayne had weakened considerably. After moving inland, Wayne weakened rapidly. The following day, Wayne was no longer a tropical cyclone.

Typhoon Wayne became the second typhoon to strike the Philippines within nine days. Furthermore, 42 people lost their lives in flood waters while attempting to cross a temporary bridge. A total of 28 persons were hurt and 39 were rescued, and there were initially reports of up to 200 people missing. Although Wayne passed south of Taiwan, moderate flooding was reported due to rough seas. Elsewhere, in China, Wayne was the fifth most intense typhoon on record to impact Fujian between 1960 and 2005. Throughout China, 440 persons were injured, 105 people died, and 30,000 dwellings collapsed. Overall, 147 people were killed due to Typhoon Wayne.

== Meteorological history ==
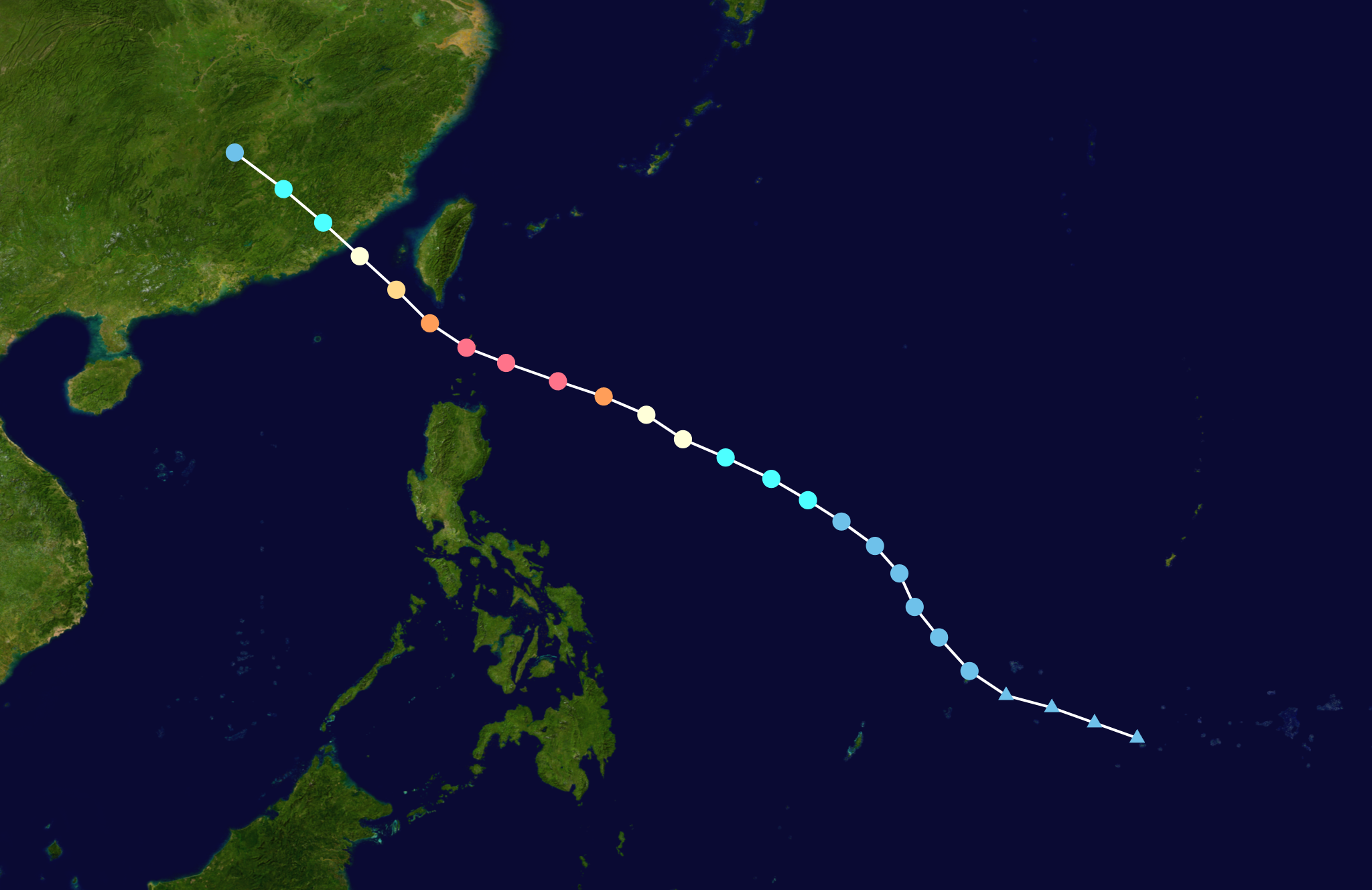
Map plotting the storm's track and intensity, according to the Saffir–Simpson scale Map key Saffir–Simpson scale Tropical depression (≤38 mph, ≤62 km/h) Tropical storm (39–73 mph, 63–118 km/h) Category 1 (74–95 mph, 119–153 km/h) Category 2 (96–110 mph, 154–177 km/h) Category 3 (111–129 mph, 178–208 km/h) Category 4 (130–156 mph, 209–251 km/h) Category 5 (≥157 mph, ≥252 km/h) Unknown Storm type Tropical cyclone Subtropical cyclone Extratropical cyclone, remnant low, tropical disturbance, or monsoon depression

Typhoon Wayne originated from an elongated surface trough west of Truk. Initially, the trough was poorly organized, but after 1200 UTC on July 21, satellite imagery indicated an increase in the organization and convective activity of the system. Based on this, a Tropical Cyclone Formation Alert (TCFA) was issued late on July 21 by the Joint Typhoon Warning Center (JTWC). Early the next day, Hurricane Hunters estimated that the system developed into a tropical depression, and the JTWC subsequently initialized warnings. Around this time, the Japan Meteorological Agency (JMA) started monitoring the system. (Note: The Japan Meteorological Agency is the official Regional Specialized Meteorological Center for the western Pacific Ocean.)

During the next 24 hours, Wayne began to intensify and was soon upgraded into a tropical storm by the JTWC. The JMA first classified the low as a tropical storm at 1800 UTC on July 22 while the system generally moved west. By early July 23, the JTWC upgraded the storm into a typhoon while the JMA upgraded the system to a severe tropical storm. Around this time, aircraft reconnaissance revealed an eyewall and a small inner core. Six hours later, the JMA upgraded Wayne to a typhoon. Later that day, the JMA announced that Wayne attained winds of 160 km/h (100 mph). The storm continued to rapidly deepen, and within 24 hours, Typhoon Wayne had more than doubled in intensity according to the JTWC. Meanwhile, the cyclone moved westward along the southern periphery of the subtropical ridge in a low wind shear environment. At 0600 UTC on July 24, the JTWC estimated that the storm attained peak intensity of 250 km/h (155 mph), a Category 4 hurricane-equivalent on the United States Saffir-Simpson Hurricane Wind Scale (SSHWS). According to the JTWC, Wayne was also a super typhoon. Early on July 24, the JMA reported that Typhoon Wayne attained peak intensity of 200 km/h (125 mph) (equivalent to a Category 3 on the SSHWS), which it maintained for 12 hours before weakening slightly. As Super Typhoon Wayne passed north of Luzon, the low-level atmospheric circulation was disrupted north of the storm by the high terrain of Taiwan and thus Wayne weakened. Wayne then began a more northwestward track and made landfall approximately 560 km (350 mi) east of Hong Kong. At the time of landfall on July 25, the JMA estimated winds of 170 km/h (105 mph), equivalent to a mid-level Category 2 system on the SSHWS. Wayne struck the coast of China at typhoon strength according to JTWC, but rapidly dissipated as it moved inland over the mountainous terrain of southeastern China. By 0000 UTC on July 26, the JMA ceased monitoring Typhoon Wayne.

== Impact and aftermath ==
Upon affecting the Philippines, Typhoon Wayne became the second system to strike Luzon in nine days after Typhoon Vera. There, 42 people lost their lives including two children and 12 woman when they drowned in flood waters while trying to cross a damaged, but temporary bridge that was built after the 1981 Pacific typhoon season. The bridge was 150 ft (45 m) long and 1 yd (0.91 m) wide and was responsible for connecting Talisay and Cebu. Many of the deceased were swept downstream the Mananga River, which was situated 2 yd (1.8 m) below the bridge. Additionally, 28 people were injured and 39 were rescued. Initially, an estimated 100 to 200 people were listed as missing, many of which were believed to have drowned in floodwaters. Many motorists were stranded due to flooding.

Despite veering south of Taiwan, Wayne generated high waves, which flooded farmland. A total of 1,482 acres (600 ha) of banana crops were flooded. Typhoon Wayne was the fifth most intense tropical cyclone to impact Fujian between 1960 and 2005. Heavy rainfall led to severe flooding in Fujian and Guangdong. Across China, 105 persons perished. In addition, 440 persons were injured and 30,000 dwellings collapsed. Although little damage was reported, winds of 43 km/h (27 mph) and gusts of 56 km/h (35 mph) were measured at Waglan Island. in Tai Po Kau, a slight storm surge was measured, peaking at 2.18 m (7.2 ft). Nearby, in Tatin's Carin, a peak rainfall total of 113.9 mm (4.48 in) was recorded.

== See also ==
- Typhoon Ellen (1983)
- Typhoon Meranti
